= List of minor planets: 11001–12000 =

The following is a partial list of minor planets, running from minor-planet number 11001 through 12000, inclusive. The primary data for this and other partial lists is based on JPL's "Small-Body Orbital Elements" and data available from the Minor Planet Center. Critical list information is also provided by the MPC, unless otherwise specified from Lowell Observatory. A detailed description of the table's columns and additional sources are given on the main page including a complete list of every page in this series, and a statistical break-up on the dynamical classification of minor planets.

Also see the summary list of all named bodies in numerical and alphabetical order, and the corresponding naming citations for the number range of this particular list. New namings may only be added to this list after official publication, as the preannouncement of names is condemned by the Working Group for Small Bodies Nomenclature of the International Astronomical Union.

Near-Earth obj.	MBA (inner)	MBA (outer)	Centaur
Mars-crosser	MBA (middle)	Jupiter trojan	Trans-Neptunian obj.
Unclassified

== 11001–11100 ==
Designation			Discovery			Properties		Ref
Permanent	Provisional	Named after	Date	Site	Discoverer(s)	Category	Diam.	Ref
11001 Andrewulff	1979 MF	Andrewulff	June 16, 1979	La Silla	H.-E. Schuster	·	3.6 km	MPC; JPL
11002 Richardlis	1979 MD_{1}	Richardlis	June 24, 1979	Siding Spring	E. F. Helin, S. J. Bus	EOS	9.8 km	MPC; JPL
11003 Andronov	1979 TT_{2}	Andronov	October 14, 1979	Nauchnij	N. S. Chernykh	·	4.2 km	MPC; JPL
11004 Stenmark	1980 FJ_{1}	Stenmark	March 16, 1980	La Silla	C.-I. Lagerkvist	·	23 km	MPC; JPL
11005 Waldtrudering	1980 PP_{1}	Waldtrudering	August 6, 1980	La Silla	R. M. West	·	8.4 km	MPC; JPL
11006 Gilson	1980 TZ_{3}	Gilson	October 9, 1980	Palomar	C. S. Shoemaker, E. M. Shoemaker	·	3.9 km	MPC; JPL
11007 Granahan	1980 VA_{3}	Granahan	November 1, 1980	Palomar	S. J. Bus	·	3.6 km	MPC; JPL
11008 Ernst	1981 EO_{7}	Ernst	March 1, 1981	Siding Spring	S. J. Bus	·	5.0 km	MPC; JPL
11009 Sigridclose	1981 ET_{10}	Sigridclose	March 1, 1981	Siding Spring	S. J. Bus	EUN	5.1 km	MPC; JPL
11010 Artemieva	1981 ET_{24}	Artemieva	March 2, 1981	Siding Spring	S. J. Bus	V	2.3 km	MPC; JPL
11011 KIAM	1981 UK_{11}	KIAM	October 22, 1981	Nauchnij	N. S. Chernykh	NYS	4.6 km	MPC; JPL
11012 Henning	1982 JH_{2}	Henning	May 15, 1982	Palomar	Palomar	·	8.0 km	MPC; JPL
11013 Kullander	1982 QP_{1}	Kullander	August 16, 1982	La Silla	C.-I. Lagerkvist	NYS	3.1 km	MPC; JPL
11014 Svätopluk	1982 QY_{1}	Svätopluk	August 23, 1982	Piszkéstető	M. Antal	·	14 km	MPC; JPL
11015 Romanenko	1982 SJ_{7}	Romanenko	September 17, 1982	Nauchnij	N. S. Chernykh	·	5.2 km	MPC; JPL
11016 Borisov	1982 SG_{12}	Borisov	September 16, 1982	Nauchnij	L. I. Chernykh	·	3.0 km	MPC; JPL
11017 Billputnam	1983 BD	Billputnam	January 16, 1983	Anderson Mesa	E. Bowell	·	12 km	MPC; JPL
11018	1983 CZ_{2}	—	February 15, 1983	Anderson Mesa	N. G. Thomas	·	5.0 km	MPC; JPL
11019 Hansrott	1984 HR	Hansrott	April 25, 1984	Kleť	A. Mrkos	NYS	3.9 km	MPC; JPL
11020 Orwell	1984 OG	Orwell	July 31, 1984	Kleť	A. Mrkos	THM	14 km	MPC; JPL
11021 Foderà	1986 AT_{2}	Foderà	January 12, 1986	Anderson Mesa	E. Bowell	·	18 km	MPC; JPL
11022 Serio	1986 EJ_{1}	Serio	March 5, 1986	Anderson Mesa	E. Bowell	·	8.9 km	MPC; JPL
11023	1986 QZ	—	August 26, 1986	La Silla	H. Debehogne	·	4.2 km	MPC; JPL
11024	1986 QC_{1}	—	August 26, 1986	La Silla	H. Debehogne	·	8.5 km	MPC; JPL
11025	1986 QJ_{1}	—	August 27, 1986	La Silla	H. Debehogne	ADE	7.6 km	MPC; JPL
11026 Greatbotkin	1986 RE_{1}	Greatbotkin	September 2, 1986	Kleť	A. Mrkos	·	3.2 km	MPC; JPL
11027 Astafʹev	1986 RX_{5}	Astafʹev	September 7, 1986	Nauchnij	L. I. Chernykh	·	2.8 km	MPC; JPL
11028	1987 UW	—	October 18, 1987	Palomar	J. E. Mueller	BAR	4.4 km	MPC; JPL
11029	1988 GZ	—	April 9, 1988	Brorfelde	P. Jensen	·	16 km	MPC; JPL
11030	1988 PK	—	August 13, 1988	Siding Spring	R. H. McNaught	·	2.4 km	MPC; JPL
11031	1988 RC_{5}	—	September 2, 1988	La Silla	H. Debehogne	·	3.6 km	MPC; JPL
11032	1988 RE_{5}	—	September 2, 1988	La Silla	H. Debehogne	NYS	3.5 km	MPC; JPL
11033 Mazanek	1988 SH_{3}	Mazanek	September 16, 1988	Cerro Tololo	S. J. Bus	·	3.5 km	MPC; JPL
11034	1988 TG	—	October 9, 1988	Gekko	Y. Oshima	·	3.1 km	MPC; JPL
11035	1988 VQ_{3}	—	November 12, 1988	Gekko	Y. Oshima	EUN	5.8 km	MPC; JPL
11036	1989 AW_{5}	—	January 4, 1989	Siding Spring	R. H. McNaught	·	3.8 km	MPC; JPL
11037 Distler	1989 CD_{6}	Distler	February 2, 1989	Tautenburg Observatory	F. Börngen	KOR	4.9 km	MPC; JPL
11038	1989 EE_{1}	—	March 8, 1989	Yorii	M. Arai, H. Mori	·	4.5 km	MPC; JPL
11039 Raynal	1989 GH_{2}	Raynal	April 3, 1989	La Silla	E. W. Elst	KOR	5.7 km	MPC; JPL
11040 Wundt	1989 RG_{1}	Wundt	September 3, 1989	Haute-Provence	E. W. Elst	·	2.1 km	MPC; JPL
11041 Fechner	1989 SH_{2}	Fechner	September 26, 1989	La Silla	E. W. Elst	·	3.8 km	MPC; JPL
11042 Ernstweber	1989 VD_{1}	Ernstweber	November 3, 1989	La Silla	E. W. Elst	V	2.7 km	MPC; JPL
11043 Pepping	1989 YX_{6}	Pepping	December 25, 1989	Tautenburg Observatory	F. Börngen	·	3.4 km	MPC; JPL
11044	1990 DV	—	February 28, 1990	Kushiro	S. Ueda, H. Kaneda	CLO	10 km	MPC; JPL
11045	1990 HH_{1}	—	April 26, 1990	Palomar	E. F. Helin	EUN	4.9 km	MPC; JPL
11046	1990 OE_{4}	—	July 30, 1990	Palomar	H. E. Holt	·	5.2 km	MPC; JPL
11047	1990 QL_{1}	—	August 22, 1990	Palomar	H. E. Holt	·	8.4 km	MPC; JPL
11048	1990 QZ_{5}	—	August 29, 1990	Palomar	H. E. Holt	·	15 km	MPC; JPL
11049	1990 RK_{2}	—	September 14, 1990	Palomar	H. E. Holt	·	4.7 km	MPC; JPL
11050 Messiaën	1990 TE_{7}	Messiaën	October 13, 1990	Tautenburg Observatory	F. Börngen, L. D. Schmadel	EOS	6.1 km	MPC; JPL
11051 Racine	1990 VH_{12}	Racine	November 15, 1990	La Silla	E. W. Elst	·	7.1 km	MPC; JPL
11052	1990 WM	—	November 20, 1990	Siding Spring	R. H. McNaught	EOS	11 km	MPC; JPL
11053	1991 CQ_{6}	—	February 3, 1991	Kushiro	S. Ueda, H. Kaneda	KOR	8.8 km	MPC; JPL
11054	1991 FA	—	March 17, 1991	Kitt Peak	Spacewatch	AMO +1km	1.4 km	MPC; JPL
11055 Honduras	1991 GT_{2}	Honduras	April 8, 1991	La Silla	E. W. Elst	·	8.4 km	MPC; JPL
11056 Volland	1991 LE_{2}	Volland	June 6, 1991	La Silla	E. W. Elst	V	9.0 km	MPC; JPL
11057	1991 NL	—	July 8, 1991	Palomar	E. F. Helin	·	5.4 km	MPC; JPL
11058	1991 PN_{10}	—	August 7, 1991	Palomar	H. E. Holt	H	1.9 km	MPC; JPL
11059 Nulliusinverba	1991 RS	Nulliusinverba	September 4, 1991	Palomar	E. F. Helin	EUN	4.9 km	MPC; JPL
11060	1991 RA_{13}	—	September 10, 1991	Palomar	H. E. Holt	·	7.7 km	MPC; JPL
11061 Lagerlöf	1991 RS_{40}	Lagerlöf	September 10, 1991	Tautenburg Observatory	F. Börngen	·	8.3 km	MPC; JPL
11062	1991 SN	—	September 30, 1991	Siding Spring	R. H. McNaught	EOS	9.6 km	MPC; JPL
11063 Poynting	1991 VC_{6}	Poynting	November 2, 1991	La Silla	E. W. Elst	·	12 km	MPC; JPL
11064 Dogen	1991 WB	Dogen	November 30, 1991	Kagoshima	M. Mukai, Takeishi, M.	·	9.0 km	MPC; JPL
11065	1991 XE_{2}	—	December 1, 1991	Palomar	H. E. Holt	GEF	12 km	MPC; JPL
11066 Sigurd	1992 CC_{1}	Sigurd	February 9, 1992	Palomar	C. S. Shoemaker, E. M. Shoemaker	APO +1km	2.1 km	MPC; JPL
11067 Greenancy	1992 DC_{3}	Greenancy	February 25, 1992	Kitt Peak	Spacewatch	·	6.3 km	MPC; JPL
11068	1992 EA	—	March 2, 1992	Kushiro	S. Ueda, H. Kaneda	·	3.8 km	MPC; JPL
11069 Bellqvist	1992 EV_{4}	Bellqvist	March 1, 1992	La Silla	UESAC	·	9.1 km	MPC; JPL
11070	1992 EV_{9}	—	March 2, 1992	La Silla	UESAC	(3460)	9.6 km	MPC; JPL
11071	1992 EU_{14}	—	March 1, 1992	La Silla	UESAC	HYG	10 km	MPC; JPL
11072 Hiraoka	1992 GP	Hiraoka	April 3, 1992	Kitami	K. Endate, K. Watanabe	PHO	8.7 km	MPC; JPL
11073 Cavell	1992 RA_{4}	Cavell	September 2, 1992	La Silla	E. W. Elst	NYS	3.0 km	MPC; JPL
11074 Kuniwake	1992 SC_{1}	Kuniwake	September 23, 1992	Kitami	K. Endate, K. Watanabe	·	4.3 km	MPC; JPL
11075 Dönhoff	1992 SP_{26}	Dönhoff	September 23, 1992	Tautenburg Observatory	F. Börngen	(6769) · slow ·	7.8 km	MPC; JPL
11076	1992 UR	—	October 21, 1992	Kiyosato	S. Otomo	PHO	6.7 km	MPC; JPL
11077	1992 WB_{2}	—	November 18, 1992	Kushiro	S. Ueda, H. Kaneda	(5)	6.1 km	MPC; JPL
11078	1992 WH_{2}	—	November 18, 1992	Kushiro	S. Ueda, H. Kaneda	·	11 km	MPC; JPL
11079 Mitsunori	1993 AJ	Mitsunori	January 13, 1993	Kitami	K. Endate, K. Watanabe	EUN	6.9 km	MPC; JPL
11080	1993 FO	—	March 23, 1993	Lake Tekapo	A. C. Gilmore, P. M. Kilmartin	·	9.5 km	MPC; JPL
11081 Persäve	1993 FA_{13}	Persäve	March 21, 1993	La Silla	UESAC	·	8.5 km	MPC; JPL
11082 Spilliaert	1993 JW	Spilliaert	May 14, 1993	La Silla	E. W. Elst	·	15 km	MPC; JPL
11083 Caracas	1993 RZ_{6}	Caracas	September 15, 1993	La Silla	E. W. Elst	·	3.7 km	MPC; JPL
11084 Giò	1993 SG_{3}	Giò	September 19, 1993	Farra d'Isonzo	Farra d'Isonzo	·	2.8 km	MPC; JPL
11085 Isala	1993 SS_{6}	Isala	September 17, 1993	La Silla	E. W. Elst	NYS	3.8 km	MPC; JPL
11086 Nagatayuji	1993 TC_{1}	Nagatayuji	October 11, 1993	Kitami	K. Endate, K. Watanabe	·	5.9 km	MPC; JPL
11087 Yamasakimakoto	1993 TK_{1}	Yamasakimakoto	October 15, 1993	Kitami	K. Endate, K. Watanabe	·	4.0 km	MPC; JPL
11088	1993 UN	—	October 19, 1993	Nachi-Katsuura	Y. Shimizu, T. Urata	·	3.0 km	MPC; JPL
11089	1994 CS_{8}	—	February 8, 1994	Mérida	Naranjo, O. A.	L5	37 km	MPC; JPL
11090 Popelin	1994 CT_{12}	Popelin	February 7, 1994	La Silla	E. W. Elst	·	5.1 km	MPC; JPL
11091 Thelonious	1994 DP	Thelonious	February 16, 1994	Kitt Peak	Spacewatch	·	8.2 km	MPC; JPL
11092 Iwakisan	1994 ED	Iwakisan	March 4, 1994	Ōizumi	T. Kobayashi	·	5.6 km	MPC; JPL
11093	1994 HD	—	April 17, 1994	Siding Spring	R. H. McNaught	·	9.9 km	MPC; JPL
11094 Cuba	1994 PG_{17}	Cuba	August 10, 1994	La Silla	E. W. Elst	·	9.9 km	MPC; JPL
11095 Havana	1994 PJ_{22}	Havana	August 12, 1994	La Silla	E. W. Elst	THM	10 km	MPC; JPL
11096	1994 RU_{1}	—	September 1, 1994	Palomar	E. F. Helin	·	12 km	MPC; JPL
11097	1994 UD_{1}	—	October 31, 1994	Nachi-Katsuura	Y. Shimizu, T. Urata	(11097) · 2:1J	8.5 km	MPC; JPL
11098 Ginsberg	1995 GC_{2}	Ginsberg	April 2, 1995	Kitt Peak	Spacewatch	·	9.2 km	MPC; JPL
11099 Sonodamasaki	1995 HL	Sonodamasaki	April 20, 1995	Kitami	K. Endate, K. Watanabe	·	9.5 km	MPC; JPL
11100 Lai	1995 KC	Lai	May 22, 1995	Bologna	San Vittore	·	3.3 km	MPC; JPL

== 11101–11200 ==
back to top

Designation			Discovery			Properties		Ref
Permanent	Provisional	Named after	Date	Site	Discoverer(s)	Category	Diam.	Ref
11101 Českáfilharmonie	1995 SH	Českáfilharmonie	September 17, 1995	Ondřejov	L. Kotková	EUN	5.4 km	MPC; JPL
11102 Bertorighini	1995 SZ_{4}	Bertorighini	September 26, 1995	San Marcello	L. Tesi	(5)	3.8 km	MPC; JPL
11103 Miekerouppe	1995 SX_{19}	Miekerouppe	September 18, 1995	Kitt Peak	Spacewatch	KOR	8.6 km	MPC; JPL
11104 Airion	1995 TQ	Airion	October 6, 1995	AMOS	AMOS	·	7.6 km	MPC; JPL
11105 Puchnarová	1995 UR_{2}	Puchnarová	October 24, 1995	Kleť	J. Tichá	·	6.9 km	MPC; JPL
11106	1995 UK_{3}	—	October 17, 1995	Nachi-Katsuura	Y. Shimizu, T. Urata	·	10 km	MPC; JPL
11107 Hakkoda	1995 UU_{4}	Hakkoda	October 25, 1995	Ōizumi	T. Kobayashi	EOS	8.9 km	MPC; JPL
11108 Hachimantai	1995 UJ_{6}	Hachimantai	October 27, 1995	Ōizumi	T. Kobayashi	EOS	7.7 km	MPC; JPL
11109 Iwatesan	1995 UG_{8}	Iwatesan	October 27, 1995	Ōizumi	T. Kobayashi	KOR	6.2 km	MPC; JPL
11110	1995 VT_{1}	—	November 2, 1995	Kiyosato	S. Otomo	·	12 km	MPC; JPL
11111 Repunit	1995 WL	Repunit	November 16, 1995	Ōizumi	T. Kobayashi	KOR	5.7 km	MPC; JPL
11112 Cagnoli	1995 WM_{2}	Cagnoli	November 18, 1995	Dossobuono	Madonna di Dossobuono	·	8.8 km	MPC; JPL
11113	1995 WW_{3}	—	November 18, 1995	Nachi-Katsuura	Y. Shimizu, T. Urata	WAT	7.6 km	MPC; JPL
11114	1995 WV_{5}	—	November 16, 1995	Chichibu	N. Satō, T. Urata	·	6.1 km	MPC; JPL
11115 Kariya	1995 WC_{7}	Kariya	November 21, 1995	Kuma Kogen	A. Nakamura	HYG	7.4 km	MPC; JPL
11116	1996 EK	—	March 10, 1996	Kushiro	S. Ueda, H. Kaneda	·	3.1 km	MPC; JPL
11117 Giuseppeolongo	1996 LP_{1}	Giuseppeolongo	June 14, 1996	Farra d'Isonzo	Farra d'Isonzo	·	2.7 km	MPC; JPL
11118 Modra	1996 PK	Modra	August 9, 1996	Modra	A. Galád, D. Kalmančok	·	7.2 km	MPC; JPL
11119 Taro	1996 PS_{9}	Taro	August 9, 1996	Nanyo	T. Okuni	·	5.6 km	MPC; JPL
11120 Pancaldi	1996 QD_{1}	Pancaldi	August 17, 1996	Bologna	San Vittore	·	3.1 km	MPC; JPL
11121 Malpighi	1996 RD_{1}	Malpighi	September 10, 1996	Pianoro	V. Goretti	·	3.3 km	MPC; JPL
11122 Eliscolombini	1996 RQ_{2}	Eliscolombini	September 13, 1996	Bologna	San Vittore	NYS	3.3 km	MPC; JPL
11123 Aliciaclaire	1996 RT_{24}	Aliciaclaire	September 8, 1996	Haleakalā	NEAT	·	7.3 km	MPC; JPL
11124 Mikulášek	1996 TR_{9}	Mikulášek	October 14, 1996	Kleť	M. Tichý, Z. Moravec	·	3.3 km	MPC; JPL
11125	1996 TL_{10}	—	October 9, 1996	Kushiro	S. Ueda, H. Kaneda	·	4.0 km	MPC; JPL
11126 Doleček	1996 TC_{15}	Doleček	October 15, 1996	Ondřejov	P. Pravec	·	4.0 km	MPC; JPL
11127 Hagi	1996 UH_{1}	Hagi	October 20, 1996	Sendai	Cross, K.	·	4.2 km	MPC; JPL
11128 Ostravia	1996 VP	Ostravia	November 3, 1996	Kleť	J. Tichá, M. Tichý	NYS	4.0 km	MPC; JPL
11129 Hayachine	1996 VS_{5}	Hayachine	November 14, 1996	Ōizumi	T. Kobayashi	MAR	6.2 km	MPC; JPL
11130	1996 VA_{30}	—	November 7, 1996	Kushiro	S. Ueda, H. Kaneda	PHO	4.9 km	MPC; JPL
11131	1996 VO_{30}	—	November 7, 1996	Kushiro	S. Ueda, H. Kaneda	·	4.6 km	MPC; JPL
11132 Horne	1996 WU	Horne	November 17, 1996	Sudbury	D. di Cicco	HYG	13 km	MPC; JPL
11133 Kumotori	1996 XY	Kumotori	December 2, 1996	Ōizumi	T. Kobayashi	·	9.3 km	MPC; JPL
11134 České Budějovice	1996 XO_{2}	České Budějovice	December 4, 1996	Kleť	M. Tichý, Z. Moravec	KOR	4.0 km	MPC; JPL
11135 Ryokami	1996 XF_{3}	Ryokami	December 3, 1996	Ōizumi	T. Kobayashi	·	5.4 km	MPC; JPL
11136 Shirleymarinus	1996 XW_{12}	Shirleymarinus	December 8, 1996	Kitt Peak	Spacewatch	V	3.8 km	MPC; JPL
11137 Yarigatake	1996 XE_{19}	Yarigatake	December 8, 1996	Ōizumi	T. Kobayashi	·	13 km	MPC; JPL
11138 Hotakadake	1996 XC_{31}	Hotakadake	December 14, 1996	Ōizumi	T. Kobayashi	·	4.5 km	MPC; JPL
11139 Qingdaoligong	1996 YF_{2}	Qingdaoligong	December 22, 1996	Xinglong	SCAP	·	4.7 km	MPC; JPL
11140 Yakedake	1997 AP_{1}	Yakedake	January 2, 1997	Ōizumi	T. Kobayashi	EOS	10 km	MPC; JPL
11141 Jindrawalter	1997 AX_{14}	Jindrawalter	January 12, 1997	Kleť	J. Tichá, M. Tichý	·	4.5 km	MPC; JPL
11142 Facchini	1997 AP_{17}	Facchini	January 7, 1997	Colleverde	V. S. Casulli	EOS	6.2 km	MPC; JPL
11143	1997 BF_{7}	—	January 28, 1997	Xinglong	SCAP	·	8.8 km	MPC; JPL
11144 Radiocommunicata	1997 CR_{1}	Radiocommunicata	February 2, 1997	Kleť	J. Tichá, M. Tichý	·	4.6 km	MPC; JPL
11145 Emanuelli	1997 QH_{1}	Emanuelli	August 29, 1997	Sormano	P. Sicoli, P. Chiavenna	·	4.7 km	MPC; JPL
11146 Kirigamine	1997 WD_{3}	Kirigamine	November 23, 1997	Ōizumi	T. Kobayashi	KOR	7.2 km	MPC; JPL
11147 Delmas	1997 XT_{5}	Delmas	December 6, 1997	Bédoin	P. Antonini	(1298)	14 km	MPC; JPL
11148 Einhardress	1997 XO_{8}	Einhardress	December 7, 1997	Caussols	ODAS	NYS	4.2 km	MPC; JPL
11149 Tateshina	1997 XZ_{9}	Tateshina	December 5, 1997	Ōizumi	T. Kobayashi	·	3.5 km	MPC; JPL
11150 Bragg	1997 YG_{1}	Bragg	December 21, 1997	Woomera	F. B. Zoltowski	·	3.1 km	MPC; JPL
11151 Oodaigahara	1997 YZ_{2}	Oodaigahara	December 24, 1997	Ōizumi	T. Kobayashi	EUN	8.8 km	MPC; JPL
11152 Oomine	1997 YH_{5}	Oomine	December 25, 1997	Ōizumi	T. Kobayashi	·	3.4 km	MPC; JPL
11153	1997 YB_{10}	—	December 25, 1997	Gekko	T. Kagawa, T. Urata	DOR	10 km	MPC; JPL
11154 Kobushi	1997 YD_{10}	Kobushi	December 28, 1997	Ōizumi	T. Kobayashi	·	5.2 km	MPC; JPL
11155 Kinpu	1997 YW_{13}	Kinpu	December 31, 1997	Ōizumi	T. Kobayashi	·	6.8 km	MPC; JPL
11156 Al-Khwarismi	1997 YP_{14}	Al-Khwarismi	December 31, 1997	Prescott	P. G. Comba	KOR	4.7 km	MPC; JPL
11157	1998 AJ	—	January 2, 1998	Nachi-Katsuura	Y. Shimizu, T. Urata	·	11 km	MPC; JPL
11158 Cirou	1998 AJ_{6}	Cirou	January 8, 1998	Caussols	ODAS	·	3.8 km	MPC; JPL
11159 Mizugaki	1998 BH_{1}	Mizugaki	January 19, 1998	Ōizumi	T. Kobayashi	·	3.7 km	MPC; JPL
11160 Wechsler	1998 BH_{7}	Wechsler	January 24, 1998	Haleakalā	NEAT	·	4.5 km	MPC; JPL
11161 Daibosatsu	1998 BA_{8}	Daibosatsu	January 25, 1998	Ōizumi	T. Kobayashi	·	3.5 km	MPC; JPL
11162	1998 BG_{8}	—	January 25, 1998	Ōizumi	T. Kobayashi	·	4.9 km	MPC; JPL
11163 Milešovka	1998 CR	Milešovka	February 4, 1998	Kleť	Z. Moravec	EOS	9.6 km	MPC; JPL
11164	1998 DW_{2}	—	February 17, 1998	Xinglong	SCAP	HOF	10 km	MPC; JPL
11165 Mariocabrera	1998 DE_{5}	Mariocabrera	February 22, 1998	Haleakalā	NEAT	·	6.1 km	MPC; JPL
11166 Anatolefrance	1998 DF_{34}	Anatolefrance	February 27, 1998	La Silla	E. W. Elst	·	6.9 km	MPC; JPL
11167 Kunžak	1998 FD_{3}	Kunžak	March 23, 1998	Ondřejov	P. Pravec	·	3.1 km	MPC; JPL
11168	1998 FO_{15}	—	March 21, 1998	Kushiro	S. Ueda, H. Kaneda	NYS	3.8 km	MPC; JPL
11169 Alkon	1998 FW_{33}	Alkon	March 20, 1998	Socorro	LINEAR	·	4.2 km	MPC; JPL
11170 Bradenmilford	1998 FY_{34}	Bradenmilford	March 20, 1998	Socorro	LINEAR	KOR	5.0 km	MPC; JPL
11171	1998 FB_{42}	—	March 20, 1998	Socorro	LINEAR	·	6.8 km	MPC; JPL
11172	1998 FT_{54}	—	March 20, 1998	Socorro	LINEAR	·	5.7 km	MPC; JPL
11173 Jayanderson	1998 FA_{59}	Jayanderson	March 20, 1998	Socorro	LINEAR	·	6.5 km	MPC; JPL
11174 Carandrews	1998 FR_{67}	Carandrews	March 20, 1998	Socorro	LINEAR	·	3.4 km	MPC; JPL
11175	1998 FY_{67}	—	March 20, 1998	Socorro	LINEAR	HIL · 3:2	20 km	MPC; JPL
11176 Batth	1998 FD_{68}	Batth	March 20, 1998	Socorro	LINEAR	·	7.4 km	MPC; JPL
11177	1998 FH_{77}	—	March 24, 1998	Socorro	LINEAR	EOS	9.6 km	MPC; JPL
11178 Emmajoy	1998 FR_{101}	Emmajoy	March 31, 1998	Socorro	LINEAR	·	7.0 km	MPC; JPL
11179 Ahmadperez	1998 FB_{109}	Ahmadperez	March 31, 1998	Socorro	LINEAR	·	4.8 km	MPC; JPL
11180 Brentperlman	1998 FU_{117}	Brentperlman	March 31, 1998	Socorro	LINEAR	PAD	9.7 km	MPC; JPL
11181	1998 FG_{118}	—	March 31, 1998	Socorro	LINEAR	·	16 km	MPC; JPL
11182	1998 GM_{6}	—	April 2, 1998	Socorro	LINEAR	·	12 km	MPC; JPL
11183	1998 GB_{7}	—	April 2, 1998	Socorro	LINEAR	·	11 km	MPC; JPL
11184 Postma	1998 HJ_{9}	Postma	April 18, 1998	Kitt Peak	Spacewatch	·	15 km	MPC; JPL
11185	1998 HS_{100}	—	April 21, 1998	Socorro	LINEAR	·	9.8 km	MPC; JPL
11186	1998 HC_{120}	—	April 23, 1998	Socorro	LINEAR	EUN	5.5 km	MPC; JPL
11187 Richoliver	1998 KO_{4}	Richoliver	May 22, 1998	Anderson Mesa	LONEOS	(5)	3.9 km	MPC; JPL
11188	1998 KD_{50}	—	May 23, 1998	Socorro	LINEAR	CYB	16 km	MPC; JPL
11189 Rabeaton	1998 QQ_{43}	Rabeaton	August 17, 1998	Socorro	LINEAR	V	3.2 km	MPC; JPL
11190 Jennibell	1998 RM_{52}	Jennibell	September 14, 1998	Socorro	LINEAR	·	2.5 km	MPC; JPL
11191 Paskvić	1998 XW_{16}	Paskvić	December 15, 1998	Višnjan Observatory	K. Korlević	·	7.8 km	MPC; JPL
11192	1998 XX_{49}	—	December 14, 1998	Socorro	LINEAR	·	5.6 km	MPC; JPL
11193 Mérida	1998 XN_{96}	Mérida	December 11, 1998	Mérida	Naranjo, O. A.	THM	13 km	MPC; JPL
11194 Mirna	1998 YE	Mirna	December 16, 1998	Višnjan Observatory	K. Korlević	·	4.1 km	MPC; JPL
11195 Woomera	1999 AY_{22}	Woomera	January 15, 1999	Woomera	F. B. Zoltowski	·	8.3 km	MPC; JPL
11196 Michanikos	1999 BO_{9}	Michanikos	January 22, 1999	Reedy Creek	J. Broughton	PAD	13 km	MPC; JPL
11197 Beranek	1999 CY_{25}	Beranek	February 10, 1999	Socorro	LINEAR	NYS	8.3 km	MPC; JPL
11198	1999 CV_{40}	—	February 10, 1999	Socorro	LINEAR	EOS	7.1 km	MPC; JPL
11199	1999 CC_{82}	—	February 12, 1999	Socorro	LINEAR	GEF	6.0 km	MPC; JPL
11200	1999 CV_{121}	—	February 11, 1999	Socorro	LINEAR	·	9.1 km	MPC; JPL

== 11201–11300 ==
back to top

Designation			Discovery			Properties		Ref
Permanent	Provisional	Named after	Date	Site	Discoverer(s)	Category	Diam.	Ref
11201 Talich	1999 EL_{5}	Talich	March 13, 1999	Ondřejov	L. Kotková	KOR	4.5 km	MPC; JPL
11202 Teddunham	1999 FA_{10}	Teddunham	March 22, 1999	Anderson Mesa	LONEOS	AGN	9.9 km	MPC; JPL
11203 Danielbetten	1999 FV_{26}	Danielbetten	March 19, 1999	Socorro	LINEAR	·	3.6 km	MPC; JPL
11204	1999 FQ_{28}	—	March 19, 1999	Socorro	LINEAR	THM	11 km	MPC; JPL
11205	1999 FY_{28}	—	March 19, 1999	Socorro	LINEAR	·	20 km	MPC; JPL
11206 Bibee	1999 FR_{29}	Bibee	March 19, 1999	Socorro	LINEAR	·	6.1 km	MPC; JPL
11207 Black	1999 FQ_{58}	Black	March 20, 1999	Socorro	LINEAR	·	3.4 km	MPC; JPL
11208	1999 GT_{16}	—	April 15, 1999	Socorro	LINEAR	EOS	6.9 km	MPC; JPL
11209	1999 GP_{18}	—	April 15, 1999	Socorro	LINEAR	EOS	9.6 km	MPC; JPL
11210 Kevinqian	1999 GP_{22}	Kevinqian	April 6, 1999	Socorro	LINEAR	·	8.5 km	MPC; JPL
11211 Saxena	1999 GD_{24}	Saxena	April 6, 1999	Socorro	LINEAR	·	4.4 km	MPC; JPL
11212 Tebbutt	1999 HS	Tebbutt	April 18, 1999	Woomera	F. B. Zoltowski	·	3.3 km	MPC; JPL
11213	1999 HF_{8}	—	April 16, 1999	Socorro	LINEAR	·	15 km	MPC; JPL
11214 Ruhisayana	1999 HP_{8}	Ruhisayana	April 16, 1999	Socorro	LINEAR	·	9.3 km	MPC; JPL
11215	1999 HN_{10}	—	April 17, 1999	Socorro	LINEAR	·	8.2 km	MPC; JPL
11216 Billhubbard	1999 JG_{1}	Billhubbard	May 8, 1999	Catalina	CSS	·	3.2 km	MPC; JPL
11217	1999 JC_{4}	—	May 10, 1999	Socorro	LINEAR	H · moon	2.1 km	MPC; JPL
11218	1999 JD_{20}	—	May 10, 1999	Socorro	LINEAR	·	13 km	MPC; JPL
11219 Benbohn	1999 JN_{20}	Benbohn	May 10, 1999	Socorro	LINEAR	·	3.4 km	MPC; JPL
11220	1999 JM_{25}	—	May 10, 1999	Socorro	LINEAR	·	6.0 km	MPC; JPL
11221	1999 JO_{26}	—	May 10, 1999	Socorro	LINEAR	·	22 km	MPC; JPL
11222	1999 JR_{27}	—	May 10, 1999	Socorro	LINEAR	EOS · slow	8.1 km	MPC; JPL
11223	1999 JC_{30}	—	May 10, 1999	Socorro	LINEAR	·	12 km	MPC; JPL
11224	1999 JP_{32}	—	May 10, 1999	Socorro	LINEAR	KOR	5.4 km	MPC; JPL
11225 Borden	1999 JD_{36}	Borden	May 10, 1999	Socorro	LINEAR	·	3.4 km	MPC; JPL
11226	1999 JO_{36}	—	May 10, 1999	Socorro	LINEAR	EOS	12 km	MPC; JPL
11227 Ksenborisova	1999 JR_{43}	Ksenborisova	May 10, 1999	Socorro	LINEAR	·	2.6 km	MPC; JPL
11228 Botnick	1999 JW_{49}	Botnick	May 10, 1999	Socorro	LINEAR	·	6.2 km	MPC; JPL
11229 Brookebowers	1999 JX_{52}	Brookebowers	May 10, 1999	Socorro	LINEAR	·	3.5 km	MPC; JPL
11230 Deschaffer	1999 JV_{57}	Deschaffer	May 10, 1999	Socorro	LINEAR	·	5.1 km	MPC; JPL
11231 Schiavo	1999 JF_{59}	Schiavo	May 10, 1999	Socorro	LINEAR	·	4.9 km	MPC; JPL
11232	1999 JA_{77}	—	May 12, 1999	Socorro	LINEAR	·	19 km	MPC; JPL
11233	1999 JA_{82}	—	May 12, 1999	Socorro	LINEAR	EUN	7.3 km	MPC; JPL
11234	1999 JS_{82}	—	May 12, 1999	Socorro	LINEAR	·	8.2 km	MPC; JPL
11235	1999 JP_{91}	—	May 12, 1999	Socorro	LINEAR	EOS	9.3 km	MPC; JPL
11236	1999 KX_{14}	—	May 18, 1999	Socorro	LINEAR	NYS	3.7 km	MPC; JPL
11237	1999 KE_{15}	—	May 18, 1999	Socorro	LINEAR	·	6.0 km	MPC; JPL
11238 Johanmaurits	2044 P-L	Johanmaurits	September 24, 1960	Palomar	C. J. van Houten, I. van Houten-Groeneveld, T. Gehrels	·	3.1 km	MPC; JPL
11239 Marcgraf	4141 P-L	Marcgraf	September 24, 1960	Palomar	C. J. van Houten, I. van Houten-Groeneveld, T. Gehrels	·	5.3 km	MPC; JPL
11240 Piso	4175 P-L	Piso	September 24, 1960	Palomar	C. J. van Houten, I. van Houten-Groeneveld, T. Gehrels	·	2.5 km	MPC; JPL
11241 Eckhout	6792 P-L	Eckhout	September 24, 1960	Palomar	C. J. van Houten, I. van Houten-Groeneveld, T. Gehrels	KOR	6.1 km	MPC; JPL
11242 Franspost	2144 T-1	Franspost	March 25, 1971	Palomar	C. J. van Houten, I. van Houten-Groeneveld, T. Gehrels	V	1.7 km	MPC; JPL
11243 de Graauw	2157 T-1	de Graauw	March 25, 1971	Palomar	C. J. van Houten, I. van Houten-Groeneveld, T. Gehrels	·	5.3 km	MPC; JPL
11244 Andrékuipers	4314 T-2	Andrékuipers	September 29, 1973	Palomar	C. J. van Houten, I. van Houten-Groeneveld, T. Gehrels	NYS	5.2 km	MPC; JPL
11245 Hansderijk	3100 T-3	Hansderijk	October 16, 1977	Palomar	C. J. van Houten, I. van Houten-Groeneveld, T. Gehrels	NYS	3.6 km	MPC; JPL
11246 Orvillewright	4250 T-3	Orvillewright	October 16, 1977	Palomar	C. J. van Houten, I. van Houten-Groeneveld, T. Gehrels	NYS	4.7 km	MPC; JPL
11247 Wilburwright	4280 T-3	Wilburwright	October 16, 1977	Palomar	C. J. van Houten, I. van Houten-Groeneveld, T. Gehrels	·	9.7 km	MPC; JPL
11248 Blériot	4354 T-3	Blériot	October 16, 1977	Palomar	C. J. van Houten, I. van Houten-Groeneveld, T. Gehrels	·	3.0 km	MPC; JPL
11249 Etna	1971 FD	Etna	March 24, 1971	Palomar	C. J. van Houten, I. van Houten-Groeneveld, T. Gehrels	T_{j} (2.97) · 3:2	10 km	MPC; JPL
11250	1972 AU	—	January 14, 1972	Hamburg-Bergedorf	L. Kohoutek	·	7.5 km	MPC; JPL
11251 Icarion	1973 SN_{1}	Icarion	September 20, 1973	Palomar	C. J. van Houten, I. van Houten-Groeneveld, T. Gehrels	L4	22 km	MPC; JPL
11252 Laërtes	1973 SA_{2}	Laërtes	September 19, 1973	Palomar	C. J. van Houten, I. van Houten-Groeneveld, T. Gehrels	L4	41 km	MPC; JPL
11253 Mesyats	1976 UP_{2}	Mesyats	October 26, 1976	Nauchnij	T. M. Smirnova	·	3.0 km	MPC; JPL
11254 Konkohekisui	1977 DL_{2}	Konkohekisui	February 18, 1977	Kiso	H. Kosai, K. Furukawa	·	5.8 km	MPC; JPL
11255 Fujiiekio	1977 DC_{4}	Fujiiekio	February 18, 1977	Kiso	H. Kosai, K. Furukawa	THM	10 km	MPC; JPL
11256 Fuglesang	1978 RO_{8}	Fuglesang	September 2, 1978	La Silla	C.-I. Lagerkvist	·	3.6 km	MPC; JPL
11257 Rodionta	1978 TP_{2}	Rodionta	October 3, 1978	Nauchnij	N. S. Chernykh	·	6.4 km	MPC; JPL
11258 Aoyama	1978 VP_{1}	Aoyama	November 1, 1978	Caussols	K. Tomita	·	11 km	MPC; JPL
11259 Yingtungchen	1978 VD_{3}	Yingtungchen	November 7, 1978	Palomar	E. F. Helin, S. J. Bus	·	4.4 km	MPC; JPL
11260 Camargo	1978 VD_{9}	Camargo	November 7, 1978	Palomar	E. F. Helin, S. J. Bus	·	3.3 km	MPC; JPL
11261 Krisbecker	1978 XK	Krisbecker	December 6, 1978	Palomar	E. Bowell, Warnock, A.	·	6.4 km	MPC; JPL
11262 Drube	1979 MP_{3}	Drube	June 25, 1979	Siding Spring	E. F. Helin, S. J. Bus	·	2.8 km	MPC; JPL
11263 Pesonen	1979 OA	Pesonen	July 23, 1979	Anderson Mesa	E. Bowell	·	10 km	MPC; JPL
11264 Claudiomaccone	1979 UC_{4}	Claudiomaccone	October 16, 1979	Nauchnij	N. S. Chernykh	(5) · moon	3.2 km	MPC; JPL
11265 Hasselmann	1981 EU_{34}	Hasselmann	March 2, 1981	Siding Spring	S. J. Bus	·	1.9 km	MPC; JPL
11266 Macke	1981 ES_{41}	Macke	March 2, 1981	Siding Spring	S. J. Bus	2:1J	7.1 km	MPC; JPL
11267 Donaldkessler	1981 UE_{28}	Donaldkessler	October 24, 1981	Palomar	S. J. Bus	HOF	11 km	MPC; JPL
11268 Spassky	1985 UF_{5}	Spassky	October 22, 1985	Nauchnij	L. V. Zhuravleva	·	7.3 km	MPC; JPL
11269 Knyr	1987 QG_{10}	Knyr	August 26, 1987	Nauchnij	L. G. Karachkina	·	2.9 km	MPC; JPL
11270	1988 EA_{2}	—	March 13, 1988	Brorfelde	P. Jensen	·	3.7 km	MPC; JPL
11271	1988 KB	—	May 19, 1988	Palomar	E. F. Helin	PHO	6.8 km	MPC; JPL
11272	1988 RK	—	September 8, 1988	Palomar	E. F. Helin	PHO	6.8 km	MPC; JPL
11273	1988 RN_{11}	—	September 14, 1988	Cerro Tololo	S. J. Bus	L5	30 km	MPC; JPL
11274 Castillo-Rogez	1988 SX_{2}	Castillo-Rogez	September 16, 1988	Cerro Tololo	S. J. Bus	3:2	10 km	MPC; JPL
11275	1988 SL_{3}	—	September 16, 1988	Cerro Tololo	S. J. Bus	L5	26 km	MPC; JPL
11276	1988 TM_{1}	—	October 13, 1988	Kushiro	S. Ueda, H. Kaneda	NYS	3.2 km	MPC; JPL
11277 Ballard	1988 TW_{2}	Ballard	October 8, 1988	Palomar	C. S. Shoemaker, E. M. Shoemaker	PHO	6.3 km	MPC; JPL
11278 Telesio	1989 SD_{3}	Telesio	September 26, 1989	La Silla	E. W. Elst	·	3.5 km	MPC; JPL
11279	1989 TC	—	October 1, 1989	Palomar	J. Alu, E. F. Helin	H	2.5 km	MPC; JPL
11280 Sakurai	1989 TY_{10}	Sakurai	October 9, 1989	Kitami	M. Yanai, K. Watanabe	·	2.7 km	MPC; JPL
11281 Nobuooshita	1989 UM_{1}	Nobuooshita	October 28, 1989	Kani	Y. Mizuno, T. Furuta	·	3.2 km	MPC; JPL
11282 Hanakusa	1989 UY_{2}	Hanakusa	October 30, 1989	Kitami	K. Endate, K. Watanabe	NYS	6.4 km	MPC; JPL
11283	1989 UX_{4}	—	October 25, 1989	Kleť	A. Mrkos	·	3.4 km	MPC; JPL
11284 Belenus	1990 BA	Belenus	January 21, 1990	Caussols	A. Maury	AMO +1km	800 m	MPC; JPL
11285	1990 QU_{3}	—	August 22, 1990	Palomar	H. E. Holt	·	3.9 km	MPC; JPL
11286	1990 RO_{8}	—	September 15, 1990	La Silla	H. Debehogne	·	3.8 km	MPC; JPL
11287	1990 SX	—	September 16, 1990	Palomar	H. E. Holt	·	11 km	MPC; JPL
11288 Okunohosomichi	1990 XU	Okunohosomichi	December 10, 1990	Geisei	T. Seki	EOS	11 km	MPC; JPL
11289 Frescobaldi	1991 PA_{2}	Frescobaldi	August 2, 1991	La Silla	E. W. Elst	THM	8.8 km	MPC; JPL
11290	1991 RA_{1}	—	September 10, 1991	Dynic	A. Sugie	EUN	4.9 km	MPC; JPL
11291	1991 RZ_{10}	—	September 10, 1991	Palomar	H. E. Holt	·	8.3 km	MPC; JPL
11292 Bunjisuzuki	1991 RC_{28}	Bunjisuzuki	September 8, 1991	Kitt Peak	Spacewatch	·	6.8 km	MPC; JPL
11293	1991 XL	—	December 4, 1991	Kushiro	S. Ueda, H. Kaneda	·	3.9 km	MPC; JPL
11294 Kazu	1992 CK	Kazu	February 4, 1992	Geisei	T. Seki	·	3.4 km	MPC; JPL
11295 Gustaflarsson	1992 EU_{28}	Gustaflarsson	March 8, 1992	La Silla	UESAC	(3460)	13 km	MPC; JPL
11296 Denzen	1992 KA	Denzen	May 24, 1992	Geisei	T. Seki	·	5.7 km	MPC; JPL
11297	1992 PP_{6}	—	August 5, 1992	La Silla	H. Debehogne, Á. López-G.	·	5.5 km	MPC; JPL
11298 Gide	1992 RE_{6}	Gide	September 2, 1992	La Silla	E. W. Elst	KOR	4.9 km	MPC; JPL
11299 Annafreud	1992 SA_{22}	Annafreud	September 22, 1992	La Silla	E. W. Elst	AGN	5.1 km	MPC; JPL
11300	1992 WG_{2}	—	November 18, 1992	Kushiro	S. Ueda, H. Kaneda	fast	5.5 km	MPC; JPL

== 11301–11400 ==
back to top

Designation			Discovery			Properties		Ref
Permanent	Provisional	Named after	Date	Site	Discoverer(s)	Category	Diam.	Ref
11301	1992 XM	—	December 14, 1992	Kiyosato	S. Otomo	EOS	12 km	MPC; JPL
11302 Rubicon	1993 BM_{5}	Rubicon	January 27, 1993	Caussols	E. W. Elst	·	10 km	MPC; JPL
11303	1993 CA_{1}	—	February 14, 1993	Okutama	Hioki, T., Hayakawa, S.	·	6.1 km	MPC; JPL
11304 Cowra	1993 DJ	Cowra	February 19, 1993	Geisei	T. Seki	H	2.4 km	MPC; JPL
11305 Ahlqvist	1993 FS_{6}	Ahlqvist	March 17, 1993	La Silla	UESAC	·	2.5 km	MPC; JPL
11306 Åkesson	1993 FF_{18}	Åkesson	March 17, 1993	La Silla	UESAC	·	8.7 km	MPC; JPL
11307 Erikolsson	1993 FA_{40}	Erikolsson	March 19, 1993	La Silla	UESAC	·	5.3 km	MPC; JPL
11308 Tofta	1993 FF_{76}	Tofta	March 21, 1993	La Silla	UESAC	KOR	4.0 km	MPC; JPL
11309 Malus	1993 PC_{7}	Malus	August 15, 1993	Caussols	E. W. Elst	·	14 km	MPC; JPL
11310	1993 SB_{15}	—	September 19, 1993	Palomar	H. E. Holt	EUN	6.8 km	MPC; JPL
11311 Peleus	1993 XN_{2}	Peleus	December 10, 1993	Palomar	C. S. Shoemaker, E. M. Shoemaker	APO +1km	2.5 km	MPC; JPL
11312	1994 AR_{2}	—	January 14, 1994	Ōizumi	T. Kobayashi	·	3.6 km	MPC; JPL
11313 Kügelgen	1994 GE_{10}	Kügelgen	April 3, 1994	Tautenburg Observatory	F. Börngen	·	4.0 km	MPC; JPL
11314 Charcot	1994 NR_{1}	Charcot	July 8, 1994	Caussols	E. W. Elst	·	9.6 km	MPC; JPL
11315 Salpêtrière	1994 NS_{1}	Salpêtrière	July 8, 1994	Caussols	E. W. Elst	·	3.3 km	MPC; JPL
11316 Fuchitatsuo	1994 TR_{3}	Fuchitatsuo	October 5, 1994	Kitami	K. Endate, K. Watanabe	NYS	3.5 km	MPC; JPL
11317 Hitoshi	1994 TX_{12}	Hitoshi	October 10, 1994	Kitt Peak	Spacewatch	THM	8.2 km	MPC; JPL
11318	1994 XZ_{4}	—	December 4, 1994	Ōizumi	T. Kobayashi	·	1.7 km	MPC; JPL
11319	1995 AZ	—	January 6, 1995	Ōizumi	T. Kobayashi	·	6.1 km	MPC; JPL
11320	1995 BY	—	January 25, 1995	Ōizumi	T. Kobayashi	KOR	5.0 km	MPC; JPL
11321 Tosimatumoto	1995 DE_{1}	Tosimatumoto	February 21, 1995	Geisei	T. Seki	EOS	9.2 km	MPC; JPL
11322 Aquamarine	1995 QT	Aquamarine	August 23, 1995	Yatsuka	H. Abe	slow	3.6 km	MPC; JPL
11323 Nasu	1995 QC_{2}	Nasu	August 21, 1995	Kitami	K. Endate, K. Watanabe	·	5.1 km	MPC; JPL
11324 Hayamizu	1995 QQ_{3}	Hayamizu	August 30, 1995	Kitami	K. Endate, K. Watanabe	·	8.1 km	MPC; JPL
11325 Slavický	1995 SG	Slavický	September 17, 1995	Ondřejov	L. Kotková	·	2.7 km	MPC; JPL
11326 Ladislavschmied	1995 SL	Ladislavschmied	September 17, 1995	Ondřejov	L. Kotková	V	2.8 km	MPC; JPL
11327	1995 SL_{2}	—	September 17, 1995	Nachi-Katsuura	Y. Shimizu, T. Urata	EUN	5.8 km	MPC; JPL
11328 Mariotozzi	1995 UL	Mariotozzi	October 19, 1995	Colleverde	V. S. Casulli	·	9.1 km	MPC; JPL
11329	1995 WJ_{2}	—	November 18, 1995	Ōizumi	T. Kobayashi	·	7.1 km	MPC; JPL
11330	1995 WZ_{6}	—	November 18, 1995	Nachi-Katsuura	Y. Shimizu, T. Urata	EOS	8.2 km	MPC; JPL
11331 Peggynugent	1996 FO_{2}	Peggynugent	March 17, 1996	Haleakalā	NEAT	·	4.4 km	MPC; JPL
11332 Jameswatt	1996 GO_{20}	Jameswatt	April 15, 1996	La Silla	E. W. Elst	·	4.3 km	MPC; JPL
11333 Forman	1996 HU	Forman	April 20, 1996	Ondřejov	P. Pravec, L. Kotková	·	3.6 km	MPC; JPL
11334 Rio de Janeiro	1996 HM_{18}	Rio de Janeiro	April 18, 1996	La Silla	E. W. Elst	MAR	4.7 km	MPC; JPL
11335 Santiago	1996 HW_{23}	Santiago	April 20, 1996	La Silla	E. W. Elst	·	3.5 km	MPC; JPL
11336 Piranesi	1996 NS_{3}	Piranesi	July 14, 1996	La Silla	E. W. Elst	·	3.4 km	MPC; JPL
11337 Sandro	1996 PG_{1}	Sandro	August 10, 1996	Montelupo	M. Tombelli, G. Forti	·	1.9 km	MPC; JPL
11338 Schiele	1996 TL_{9}	Schiele	October 13, 1996	Kleť	J. Tichá, M. Tichý	·	6.2 km	MPC; JPL
11339 Orlík	1996 VM_{5}	Orlík	November 13, 1996	Kleť	M. Tichý, Z. Moravec	·	5.5 km	MPC; JPL
11340	1996 VN_{5}	—	November 14, 1996	Oohira	T. Urata	·	11 km	MPC; JPL
11341 Babbage	1996 XE_{2}	Babbage	December 3, 1996	Prescott	P. G. Comba	V	4.4 km	MPC; JPL
11342	1996 XJ_{19}	—	December 8, 1996	Ōizumi	T. Kobayashi	·	5.8 km	MPC; JPL
11343	1996 XP_{19}	—	December 8, 1996	Ōizumi	T. Kobayashi	·	3.9 km	MPC; JPL
11344	1996 XH_{31}	—	December 14, 1996	Ōizumi	T. Kobayashi	NYS	2.9 km	MPC; JPL
11345	1996 YM	—	December 20, 1996	Ōizumi	T. Kobayashi	NYS	4.5 km	MPC; JPL
11346	1997 AP_{14}	—	January 10, 1997	Ōizumi	T. Kobayashi	·	6.7 km	MPC; JPL
11347	1997 AG_{21}	—	January 9, 1997	Kushiro	S. Ueda, H. Kaneda	·	5.3 km	MPC; JPL
11348 Allegra	1997 BG_{9}	Allegra	January 30, 1997	Cima Ekar	M. Tombelli, U. Munari	KOR	6.1 km	MPC; JPL
11349 Witten	1997 JH_{16}	Witten	May 3, 1997	La Silla	E. W. Elst	V	2.9 km	MPC; JPL
11350 Teresa	1997 QN_{4}	Teresa	August 29, 1997	Majorca	Á. López J., R. Pacheco	KOR	5.8 km	MPC; JPL
11351 Leucus	1997 TS_{25}	Leucus	October 12, 1997	Xinglong	SCAP	L4 · slow	34 km	MPC; JPL
11352 Koldewey	1997 WP_{22}	Koldewey	November 28, 1997	Caussols	ODAS	THM	13 km	MPC; JPL
11353 Guillaume	1997 XX_{5}	Guillaume	December 5, 1997	Caussols	ODAS	KOR	5.6 km	MPC; JPL
11354	1997 XY_{9}	—	December 5, 1997	Ōizumi	T. Kobayashi	NYS	3.5 km	MPC; JPL
11355	1997 XL_{11}	—	December 15, 1997	Xinglong	SCAP	·	5.7 km	MPC; JPL
11356 Chuckjones	1997 YA	Chuckjones	December 18, 1997	Woomera	F. B. Zoltowski	EOS	8.6 km	MPC; JPL
11357	1997 YX_{2}	—	December 21, 1997	Ōizumi	T. Kobayashi	·	4.2 km	MPC; JPL
11358	1997 YY_{5}	—	December 25, 1997	Ōizumi	T. Kobayashi	EOS	14 km	MPC; JPL
11359 Piteglio	1998 BP_{24}	Piteglio	January 27, 1998	San Marcello	L. Tesi, Cecchini, V.	·	4.7 km	MPC; JPL
11360 Formigine	1998 DL_{14}	Formigine	February 24, 1998	Bologna	San Vittore	NYS	2.1 km	MPC; JPL
11361 Orbinskij	1998 DD_{36}	Orbinskij	February 28, 1998	Geisei	T. Seki	moon	4.5 km	MPC; JPL
11362	1998 EN_{9}	—	March 6, 1998	Gekko	T. Kagawa	·	5.5 km	MPC; JPL
11363 Vives	1998 EB_{12}	Vives	March 1, 1998	La Silla	E. W. Elst	·	4.3 km	MPC; JPL
11364 Karlštejn	1998 FB_{3}	Karlštejn	March 23, 1998	Ondřejov	P. Pravec	·	3.2 km	MPC; JPL
11365 NASA	1998 FK_{126}	NASA	March 23, 1998	Reedy Creek	J. Broughton	·	3.8 km	MPC; JPL
11366	1998 GL_{9}	—	April 2, 1998	Socorro	LINEAR	slow	7.5 km	MPC; JPL
11367 Rachelseevers	1998 HJ_{115}	Rachelseevers	April 23, 1998	Socorro	LINEAR	·	5.3 km	MPC; JPL
11368	1998 HN_{115}	—	April 23, 1998	Socorro	LINEAR	GEF	8.0 km	MPC; JPL
11369 Brazelton	1998 QE_{33}	Brazelton	August 17, 1998	Socorro	LINEAR	·	2.8 km	MPC; JPL
11370 Nabrown	1998 QD_{35}	Nabrown	August 17, 1998	Socorro	LINEAR	·	4.2 km	MPC; JPL
11371 Camley	1998 QO_{38}	Camley	August 17, 1998	Socorro	LINEAR	·	2.8 km	MPC; JPL
11372 Aditisingh	1998 QP_{41}	Aditisingh	August 17, 1998	Socorro	LINEAR	KOR	5.6 km	MPC; JPL
11373 Carbonaro	1998 QG_{49}	Carbonaro	August 17, 1998	Socorro	LINEAR	·	2.2 km	MPC; JPL
11374 Briantaylor	1998 QU_{60}	Briantaylor	August 23, 1998	Anderson Mesa	LONEOS	·	4.5 km	MPC; JPL
11375	1998 QB_{74}	—	August 24, 1998	Socorro	LINEAR	EOS	12 km	MPC; JPL
11376 Taizomuta	1998 SY_{5}	Taizomuta	September 20, 1998	Kitt Peak	Spacewatch	MAS	3.0 km	MPC; JPL
11377 Nye	1998 SH_{59}	Nye	September 17, 1998	Anderson Mesa	LONEOS	THM	9.8 km	MPC; JPL
11378 Dauria	1998 SV_{60}	Dauria	September 17, 1998	Anderson Mesa	LONEOS	·	6.8 km	MPC; JPL
11379 Flaubert	1998 SY_{74}	Flaubert	September 21, 1998	La Silla	E. W. Elst	·	4.8 km	MPC; JPL
11380 Amolsingh	1998 SK_{100}	Amolsingh	September 26, 1998	Socorro	LINEAR	·	5.8 km	MPC; JPL
11381	1998 SZ_{115}	—	September 26, 1998	Socorro	LINEAR	HYG	10 km	MPC; JPL
11382 Juliasitu	1998 SW_{127}	Juliasitu	September 26, 1998	Socorro	LINEAR	·	2.4 km	MPC; JPL
11383	1998 SD_{128}	—	September 26, 1998	Socorro	LINEAR	·	6.4 km	MPC; JPL
11384 Sartre	1998 SW_{143}	Sartre	September 18, 1998	La Silla	E. W. Elst	·	3.0 km	MPC; JPL
11385 Beauvoir	1998 SP_{147}	Beauvoir	September 20, 1998	La Silla	E. W. Elst	·	13 km	MPC; JPL
11386	1998 TA_{18}	—	October 12, 1998	Kushiro	S. Ueda, H. Kaneda	·	13 km	MPC; JPL
11387	1998 UA_{37}	—	October 28, 1998	Socorro	LINEAR	·	5.6 km	MPC; JPL
11388	1998 VU_{4}	—	November 11, 1998	Ondřejov	L. Kotková	HIL · 3:2	25 km	MPC; JPL
11389	1998 VV_{5}	—	November 11, 1998	Ōizumi	T. Kobayashi	HYG	13 km	MPC; JPL
11390	1998 VG_{15}	—	November 10, 1998	Socorro	LINEAR	THM	11 km	MPC; JPL
11391	1998 VA_{35}	—	November 12, 1998	Kushiro	S. Ueda, H. Kaneda	·	4.2 km	MPC; JPL
11392 Paulpeeters	1998 WC_{3}	Paulpeeters	November 19, 1998	Caussols	ODAS	PAD	7.8 km	MPC; JPL
11393	1998 XJ_{53}	—	December 14, 1998	Socorro	LINEAR	·	13 km	MPC; JPL
11394	1998 XL_{77}	—	December 15, 1998	Socorro	LINEAR	·	17 km	MPC; JPL
11395 Iphinous	1998 XN_{77}	Iphinous	December 15, 1998	Socorro	LINEAR	L4	69 km	MPC; JPL
11396	1998 XZ_{77}	—	December 15, 1998	Socorro	LINEAR	L4	37 km	MPC; JPL
11397 Eriopis	1998 XX_{93}	Eriopis	December 15, 1998	Socorro	LINEAR	L4	45 km	MPC; JPL
11398	1998 YP_{11}	—	December 23, 1998	Socorro	LINEAR	AMO +1km	1.3 km	MPC; JPL
11399	1999 AR_{3}	—	January 10, 1999	Ōizumi	T. Kobayashi	·	3.7 km	MPC; JPL
11400 Raša	1999 AT_{21}	Raša	January 15, 1999	Višnjan Observatory	K. Korlević	·	2.4 km	MPC; JPL

== 11401–11500 ==
back to top

Designation			Discovery			Properties		Ref
Permanent	Provisional	Named after	Date	Site	Discoverer(s)	Category	Diam.	Ref
11401 Pierralba	1999 AF_{25}	Pierralba	January 15, 1999	Caussols	ODAS	·	3.9 km	MPC; JPL
11402	1999 BD	—	January 16, 1999	Ōizumi	T. Kobayashi	·	2.8 km	MPC; JPL
11403	1999 BW	—	January 16, 1999	Gekko	T. Kagawa	·	6.9 km	MPC; JPL
11404 Wittig	1999 BX_{4}	Wittig	January 19, 1999	Caussols	ODAS	·	9.8 km	MPC; JPL
11405	1999 CV_{3}	—	February 10, 1999	Socorro	LINEAR	APO +1km	3.6 km	MPC; JPL
11406 Ucciocontin	1999 CY_{14}	Ucciocontin	February 15, 1999	Višnjan Observatory	K. Korlević	·	5.9 km	MPC; JPL
11407 Madsubramanian	1999 CV_{50}	Madsubramanian	February 10, 1999	Socorro	LINEAR	·	3.1 km	MPC; JPL
11408 Zahradník	1999 EG_{3}	Zahradník	March 13, 1999	Ondřejov	L. Kotková	THM	11 km	MPC; JPL
11409 Horkheimer	1999 FD_{9}	Horkheimer	March 19, 1999	Anderson Mesa	LONEOS	THM	15 km	MPC; JPL
11410	1999 FU_{34}	—	March 19, 1999	Socorro	LINEAR	3:2	30 km	MPC; JPL
11411	1999 HK_{1}	—	April 16, 1999	Socorro	LINEAR	H	1.8 km	MPC; JPL
11412	1999 JE_{19}	—	May 10, 1999	Socorro	LINEAR	EOS	8.7 km	MPC; JPL
11413 Catanach	1999 JG_{21}	Catanach	May 10, 1999	Socorro	LINEAR	·	3.8 km	MPC; JPL
11414 Allanchu	1999 JU_{26}	Allanchu	May 10, 1999	Socorro	LINEAR	·	4.2 km	MPC; JPL
11415	1999 JG_{81}	—	May 14, 1999	Socorro	LINEAR	·	3.7 km	MPC; JPL
11416	1999 JK_{96}	—	May 12, 1999	Socorro	LINEAR	·	12 km	MPC; JPL
11417 Chughtai	1999 JW_{117}	Chughtai	May 13, 1999	Socorro	LINEAR	·	4.3 km	MPC; JPL
11418 Williamwang	1999 JN_{118}	Williamwang	May 13, 1999	Socorro	LINEAR	PAD	9.1 km	MPC; JPL
11419 Donjohnson	1999 KS_{2}	Donjohnson	May 16, 1999	Kitt Peak	Spacewatch	EOS	9.6 km	MPC; JPL
11420 Zoeweiss	1999 KR_{14}	Zoeweiss	May 18, 1999	Socorro	LINEAR	·	4.5 km	MPC; JPL
11421 Cardano	1999 LW_{2}	Cardano	June 10, 1999	Prescott	P. G. Comba	THM	14 km	MPC; JPL
11422 Alilienthal	1999 LD_{7}	Alilienthal	June 10, 1999	Kitt Peak	Spacewatch	(5)	3.9 km	MPC; JPL
11423 Cronin	1999 LT_{24}	Cronin	June 9, 1999	Socorro	LINEAR	·	4.4 km	MPC; JPL
11424	1999 LZ_{24}	—	June 9, 1999	Socorro	LINEAR	PHO	13 km	MPC; JPL
11425 Wearydunlop	1999 MF	Wearydunlop	June 18, 1999	Reedy Creek	J. Broughton	·	3.2 km	MPC; JPL
11426 Molster	2527 P-L	Molster	September 24, 1960	Palomar	C. J. van Houten, I. van Houten-Groeneveld, T. Gehrels	THB	9.5 km	MPC; JPL
11427 Willemkolff	2611 P-L	Willemkolff	September 24, 1960	Palomar	C. J. van Houten, I. van Houten-Groeneveld, T. Gehrels	·	12 km	MPC; JPL
11428 Alcinoös	4139 P-L	Alcinoös	September 24, 1960	Palomar	C. J. van Houten, I. van Houten-Groeneveld, T. Gehrels	L4	32 km	MPC; JPL
11429 Demodokus	4655 P-L	Demodokus	September 24, 1960	Palomar	C. J. van Houten, I. van Houten-Groeneveld, T. Gehrels	L4	38 km	MPC; JPL
11430 Lodewijkberg	9560 P-L	Lodewijkberg	October 17, 1960	Palomar	C. J. van Houten, I. van Houten-Groeneveld, T. Gehrels	·	2.5 km	MPC; JPL
11431 Karelbosscha	4843 T-1	Karelbosscha	May 13, 1971	Palomar	C. J. van Houten, I. van Houten-Groeneveld, T. Gehrels	·	6.8 km	MPC; JPL
11432 Kerkhoven	1052 T-2	Kerkhoven	September 29, 1973	Palomar	C. J. van Houten, I. van Houten-Groeneveld, T. Gehrels	THM	7.7 km	MPC; JPL
11433 Gemmafrisius	3474 T-3	Gemmafrisius	October 16, 1977	Palomar	C. J. van Houten, I. van Houten-Groeneveld, T. Gehrels	NYS	3.4 km	MPC; JPL
11434 Lohnert	1931 TC_{2}	Lohnert	October 10, 1931	Heidelberg	K. Reinmuth	CLO	9.6 km	MPC; JPL
11435	1931 UB	—	October 17, 1931	Heidelberg	K. Reinmuth	NYS	4.2 km	MPC; JPL
11436	1969 QR	—	August 22, 1969	Hamburg-Bergedorf	L. Kohoutek	·	3.7 km	MPC; JPL
11437 Cardalda	1971 SB	Cardalda	September 16, 1971	El Leoncito	Gibson, J., C. U. Cesco	H	2.7 km	MPC; JPL
11438 Zeldovich	1973 QR_{1}	Zeldovich	August 29, 1973	Nauchnij	T. M. Smirnova	·	5.0 km	MPC; JPL
11439	1974 XW	—	December 14, 1974	Nanking	Purple Mountain	·	9.2 km	MPC; JPL
11440 Massironi	1975 SC_{2}	Massironi	September 30, 1975	Palomar	S. J. Bus	CYB	12 km	MPC; JPL
11441 Anadiego	1975 YD	Anadiego	December 31, 1975	El Leoncito	Cesco, M. R.	·	6.8 km	MPC; JPL
11442 Seijin-Sanso	1976 UN_{14}	Seijin-Sanso	October 22, 1976	Kiso	H. Kosai, K. Furukawa	·	4.0 km	MPC; JPL
11443 Youdale	1977 CP	Youdale	February 11, 1977	Palomar	E. Bowell	·	2.9 km	MPC; JPL
11444 Peshekhonov	1978 QA_{2}	Peshekhonov	August 31, 1978	Nauchnij	N. S. Chernykh	·	3.0 km	MPC; JPL
11445 Fedotov	1978 SC_{7}	Fedotov	September 26, 1978	Nauchnij	L. V. Zhuravleva	EUN	4.5 km	MPC; JPL
11446 Betankur	1978 TO_{8}	Betankur	October 9, 1978	Nauchnij	L. V. Zhuravleva	·	11 km	MPC; JPL
11447	1978 UL_{4}	—	October 27, 1978	Palomar	C. M. Olmstead	·	5.3 km	MPC; JPL
11448 Miahajduková	1979 MB_{6}	Miahajduková	June 25, 1979	Siding Spring	E. F. Helin, S. J. Bus	·	2.4 km	MPC; JPL
11449 Stephwerner	1979 QP	Stephwerner	August 22, 1979	La Silla	C.-I. Lagerkvist	KOR	7.6 km	MPC; JPL
11450 Shearer	1979 QJ_{1}	Shearer	August 22, 1979	La Silla	C.-I. Lagerkvist	·	5.0 km	MPC; JPL
11451 Aarongolden	1979 QR_{1}	Aarongolden	August 22, 1979	La Silla	C.-I. Lagerkvist	·	7.7 km	MPC; JPL
11452	1980 KE	—	May 22, 1980	La Silla	H. Debehogne	·	4.7 km	MPC; JPL
11453 Cañada-Assandri	1981 DS_{1}	Cañada-Assandri	February 28, 1981	Siding Spring	S. J. Bus	·	4.8 km	MPC; JPL
11454 Mariomelita	1981 DT_{2}	Mariomelita	February 28, 1981	Siding Spring	S. J. Bus	MAR	5.7 km	MPC; JPL
11455 Richardstarr	1981 EN_{4}	Richardstarr	March 2, 1981	Siding Spring	S. J. Bus	·	5.1 km	MPC; JPL
11456 Cotto-Figueroa	1981 EK_{9}	Cotto-Figueroa	March 1, 1981	Siding Spring	S. J. Bus	·	11 km	MPC; JPL
11457 Hitomikobayashi	1981 EF_{12}	Hitomikobayashi	March 1, 1981	Siding Spring	S. J. Bus	(2076)	1.8 km	MPC; JPL
11458 Rosemarypike	1981 EV_{12}	Rosemarypike	March 1, 1981	Siding Spring	S. J. Bus	EOS	7.9 km	MPC; JPL
11459 Andráspál	1981 ET_{13}	Andráspál	March 1, 1981	Siding Spring	S. J. Bus	·	2.8 km	MPC; JPL
11460 Juliafang	1981 EZ_{15}	Juliafang	March 1, 1981	Siding Spring	S. J. Bus	·	1.9 km	MPC; JPL
11461 Wladimirneumann	1981 EM_{18}	Wladimirneumann	March 2, 1981	Siding Spring	S. J. Bus	(2076)	3.5 km	MPC; JPL
11462 Hsingwenlin	1981 ES_{23}	Hsingwenlin	March 3, 1981	Siding Spring	S. J. Bus	·	3.7 km	MPC; JPL
11463 Petrpokorny	1981 EN_{24}	Petrpokorny	March 2, 1981	Siding Spring	S. J. Bus	·	2.5 km	MPC; JPL
11464 Moser	1981 EL_{28}	Moser	March 6, 1981	Siding Spring	S. J. Bus	·	5.4 km	MPC; JPL
11465 Fulvio	1981 EP_{30}	Fulvio	March 2, 1981	Siding Spring	S. J. Bus	·	13 km	MPC; JPL
11466 Katharinaotto	1981 EL_{33}	Katharinaotto	March 1, 1981	Siding Spring	S. J. Bus	slow	2.7 km	MPC; JPL
11467 Simonporter	1981 EA_{36}	Simonporter	March 3, 1981	Siding Spring	S. J. Bus	·	3.2 km	MPC; JPL
11468 Shantanunaidu	1981 EU_{42}	Shantanunaidu	March 2, 1981	Siding Spring	S. J. Bus	·	6.5 km	MPC; JPL
11469 Rozitis	1981 EZ_{42}	Rozitis	March 2, 1981	Siding Spring	S. J. Bus	·	2.2 km	MPC; JPL
11470 Davidminton	1981 EE_{47}	Davidminton	March 2, 1981	Siding Spring	S. J. Bus	(5)	4.0 km	MPC; JPL
11471 Toshihirabayashi	1981 EH_{48}	Toshihirabayashi	March 6, 1981	Siding Spring	S. J. Bus	·	2.9 km	MPC; JPL
11472	1981 SE_{9}	—	September 24, 1981	Bickley	Perth Observatory	NYS	2.7 km	MPC; JPL
11473 Barbaresco	1982 SC	Barbaresco	September 22, 1982	Anderson Mesa	E. Bowell	·	8.3 km	MPC; JPL
11474	1982 SM_{2}	—	September 18, 1982	La Silla	H. Debehogne	slow?	3.1 km	MPC; JPL
11475 Velinský	1982 VL	Velinský	November 11, 1982	Kleť	Z. Vávrová	·	3.8 km	MPC; JPL
11476 Stefanosimoni	1984 HH_{1}	Stefanosimoni	April 23, 1984	La Silla	V. Zappalà	NYS	2.5 km	MPC; JPL
11477	1984 SY_{1}	—	September 29, 1984	Kleť	A. Mrkos	EOS · slow	11 km	MPC; JPL
11478	1985 CD	—	February 14, 1985	Toyota	K. Suzuki, T. Urata	EUN	5.6 km	MPC; JPL
11479	1986 EP_{5}	—	March 6, 1986	La Silla	G. de Sanctis	THM	17 km	MPC; JPL
11480 Velikij Ustyug	1986 RW_{5}	Velikij Ustyug	September 7, 1986	Nauchnij	L. I. Chernykh	·	3.4 km	MPC; JPL
11481 Znannya	1987 WO_{1}	Znannya	November 22, 1987	Anderson Mesa	E. Bowell	·	7.2 km	MPC; JPL
11482	1988 BW	—	January 25, 1988	Kushiro	S. Ueda, H. Kaneda	EUN	5.9 km	MPC; JPL
11483	1988 BC_{4}	—	January 19, 1988	La Silla	H. Debehogne	·	3.6 km	MPC; JPL
11484 Daudet	1988 DF_{2}	Daudet	February 17, 1988	La Silla	E. W. Elst	·	3.9 km	MPC; JPL
11485 Zinzendorf	1988 RW_{3}	Zinzendorf	September 8, 1988	Tautenburg Observatory	F. Börngen	THM	7.7 km	MPC; JPL
11486	1988 RE_{6}	—	September 5, 1988	La Silla	H. Debehogne	·	2.8 km	MPC; JPL
11487	1988 RG_{10}	—	September 14, 1988	Cerro Tololo	S. J. Bus	L5	32 km	MPC; JPL
11488 Zeleia	1988 RM_{11}	Zeleia	September 14, 1988	Cerro Tololo	S. J. Bus	L5	22 km	MPC; JPL
11489	1988 SN	—	September 22, 1988	Kushiro	S. Ueda, H. Kaneda	V	4.0 km	MPC; JPL
11490	1988 TE	—	October 3, 1988	Kushiro	S. Ueda, H. Kaneda	NYS	3.8 km	MPC; JPL
11491	1988 VT_{2}	—	November 8, 1988	Kushiro	S. Ueda, H. Kaneda	NYS ·	6.4 km	MPC; JPL
11492 Shimose	1988 VR_{3}	Shimose	November 13, 1988	Kitami	K. Endate, K. Watanabe	NYS	4.3 km	MPC; JPL
11493	1988 VN_{5}	—	November 4, 1988	Kleť	A. Mrkos	NYS	5.0 km	MPC; JPL
11494 Hibiki	1988 VM_{9}	Hibiki	November 2, 1988	Kitami	M. Yanai, K. Watanabe	·	8.9 km	MPC; JPL
11495 Fukunaga	1988 XR	Fukunaga	December 3, 1988	Kitami	K. Endate, K. Watanabe	·	2.7 km	MPC; JPL
11496 Grass	1989 AG_{7}	Grass	January 10, 1989	Tautenburg Observatory	F. Börngen	·	4.2 km	MPC; JPL
11497	1989 CG_{1}	—	February 6, 1989	Palomar	E. F. Helin	·	7.9 km	MPC; JPL
11498 Julgeerts	1989 GS_{4}	Julgeerts	April 3, 1989	La Silla	E. W. Elst	·	5.9 km	MPC; JPL
11499 Duras	1989 RL	Duras	September 2, 1989	Haute-Provence	E. W. Elst	·	3.0 km	MPC; JPL
11500 Tomaiyowit	1989 UR	Tomaiyowit	October 28, 1989	Palomar	J. E. Mueller, Mendenhall, J. D.	APO · PHA	740 m	MPC; JPL

== 11501–11600 ==
back to top

Designation			Discovery			Properties		Ref
Permanent	Provisional	Named after	Date	Site	Discoverer(s)	Category	Diam.	Ref
11501 Ushimaru	1989 UU_{3}	Ushimaru	October 29, 1989	Kani	Y. Mizuno, T. Furuta	·	2.7 km	MPC; JPL
11502	1989 WU_{2}	—	November 21, 1989	Kushiro	S. Ueda, H. Kaneda	THM	12 km	MPC; JPL
11503 Isobeken	1990 BF	Isobeken	January 21, 1990	Kani	Y. Mizuno, T. Furuta	·	5.1 km	MPC; JPL
11504 Kazo	1990 BT	Kazo	January 21, 1990	Okutama	Hioki, T., Hayakawa, S.	·	4.2 km	MPC; JPL
11505	1990 DW_{2}	—	February 24, 1990	La Silla	H. Debehogne	CYB	17 km	MPC; JPL
11506 Toulouse-Lautrec	1990 ES_{1}	Toulouse-Lautrec	March 2, 1990	La Silla	E. W. Elst	·	3.2 km	MPC; JPL
11507 Danpascu	1990 OF	Danpascu	July 20, 1990	Palomar	E. F. Helin	·	5.5 km	MPC; JPL
11508 Stolte	1990 TF_{13}	Stolte	October 12, 1990	Tautenburg Observatory	L. D. Schmadel, F. Börngen	GEF	6.6 km	MPC; JPL
11509 Thersilochos	1990 VL_{6}	Thersilochos	November 15, 1990	La Silla	E. W. Elst	L5	50 km	MPC; JPL
11510 Borges	1990 VV_{8}	Borges	November 11, 1990	La Silla	E. W. Elst	BRA	8.2 km	MPC; JPL
11511 Billknopf	1990 WK_{2}	Billknopf	November 18, 1990	Palomar	E. F. Helin	·	6.1 km	MPC; JPL
11512	1991 AB_{2}	—	January 11, 1991	Palomar	E. F. Helin	·	4.3 km	MPC; JPL
11513	1991 CE_{1}	—	February 12, 1991	Yatsugatake	Y. Kushida, O. Muramatsu	slow	16 km	MPC; JPL
11514 Tsunenaga	1991 CO_{1}	Tsunenaga	February 13, 1991	Sendai	M. Koishikawa	EOS	10 km	MPC; JPL
11515 Oshijyo	1991 CR_{1}	Oshijyo	February 12, 1991	Yorii	M. Arai, H. Mori	·	9.7 km	MPC; JPL
11516 Arthurpage	1991 ED	Arthurpage	March 6, 1991	Geisei	T. Seki	V	2.8 km	MPC; JPL
11517 Esteracuna	1991 EA_{4}	Esteracuna	March 12, 1991	La Silla	H. Debehogne	THM ·	10 km	MPC; JPL
11518 Jung	1991 GB_{3}	Jung	April 8, 1991	La Silla	E. W. Elst	THM	13 km	MPC; JPL
11519 Adler	1991 GZ_{4}	Adler	April 8, 1991	La Silla	E. W. Elst	MAS	2.6 km	MPC; JPL
11520 Fromm	1991 GE_{8}	Fromm	April 8, 1991	La Silla	E. W. Elst	(2076)	3.7 km	MPC; JPL
11521 Erikson	1991 GE_{9}	Erikson	April 10, 1991	La Silla	E. W. Elst	THM	12 km	MPC; JPL
11522	1991 JF	—	May 3, 1991	Oohira	T. Urata	V	3.7 km	MPC; JPL
11523	1991 PK_{1}	—	August 15, 1991	Palomar	E. F. Helin	·	4.1 km	MPC; JPL
11524 Pleyel	1991 PY_{2}	Pleyel	August 2, 1991	La Silla	E. W. Elst	·	5.4 km	MPC; JPL
11525	1991 RE_{25}	—	September 11, 1991	Palomar	H. E. Holt	·	4.3 km	MPC; JPL
11526	1991 UL_{3}	—	October 31, 1991	Kushiro	S. Ueda, H. Kaneda	ADE ·	5.6 km	MPC; JPL
11527	1991 VU_{4}	—	November 5, 1991	Kiyosato	S. Otomo	·	7.3 km	MPC; JPL
11528 Mie	1991 XH	Mie	December 3, 1991	Yatsugatake	Y. Kushida, O. Muramatsu	EUN	8.4 km	MPC; JPL
11529	1992 BJ_{1}	—	January 28, 1992	Kushiro	S. Ueda, H. Kaneda	·	3.7 km	MPC; JPL
11530 d'Indy	1992 CP_{2}	d'Indy	February 2, 1992	La Silla	E. W. Elst	·	5.0 km	MPC; JPL
11531	1992 DL_{7}	—	February 29, 1992	La Silla	UESAC	·	8.8 km	MPC; JPL
11532 Gullin	1992 ER_{4}	Gullin	March 1, 1992	La Silla	UESAC	KOR	5.7 km	MPC; JPL
11533 Akebäck	1992 EG_{6}	Akebäck	March 1, 1992	La Silla	UESAC	·	7.1 km	MPC; JPL
11534	1992 EB_{16}	—	March 1, 1992	La Silla	UESAC	KOR	7.5 km	MPC; JPL
11535	1992 EQ_{27}	—	March 4, 1992	La Silla	UESAC	KOR	5.4 km	MPC; JPL
11536	1992 FZ	—	March 26, 1992	Kushiro	S. Ueda, H. Kaneda	·	20 km	MPC; JPL
11537 Guericke	1992 HY_{6}	Guericke	April 29, 1992	Tautenburg Observatory	F. Börngen	·	3.1 km	MPC; JPL
11538 Brunico	1992 OJ_{8}	Brunico	July 22, 1992	La Silla	H. Debehogne, Á. López-G.	·	4.4 km	MPC; JPL
11539	1992 PQ_{2}	—	August 2, 1992	Palomar	H. E. Holt	V	2.5 km	MPC; JPL
11540	1992 PV_{3}	—	August 5, 1992	Palomar	H. E. Holt	·	3.6 km	MPC; JPL
11541	1992 SY_{14}	—	September 28, 1992	Kushiro	S. Ueda, H. Kaneda	·	3.6 km	MPC; JPL
11542 Solikamsk	1992 SU_{21}	Solikamsk	September 22, 1992	La Silla	E. W. Elst	T_{j} (2.99) · 3:2	30 km	MPC; JPL
11543	1992 UN_{2}	—	October 25, 1992	Uenohara	N. Kawasato	NYS	2.8 km	MPC; JPL
11544	1992 UD_{3}	—	October 26, 1992	Kiyosato	S. Otomo	·	4.8 km	MPC; JPL
11545 Hashimoto	1992 UE_{4}	Hashimoto	October 26, 1992	Kitami	K. Endate, K. Watanabe	·	2.7 km	MPC; JPL
11546 Miyoshimachi	1992 UM_{6}	Miyoshimachi	October 28, 1992	Kitami	M. Yanai, K. Watanabe	·	5.9 km	MPC; JPL
11547 Griesser	1992 UP_{8}	Griesser	October 31, 1992	Tautenburg Observatory	F. Börngen	·	2.1 km	MPC; JPL
11548 Jerrylewis	1992 WD_{8}	Jerrylewis	November 25, 1992	Palomar	C. S. Shoemaker, D. H. Levy	PHO	5.8 km	MPC; JPL
11549	1992 YY	—	December 25, 1992	Yakiimo	Natori, A., T. Urata	moon	11 km	MPC; JPL
11550	1993 BN	—	January 20, 1993	Oohira	T. Urata	·	5.4 km	MPC; JPL
11551	1993 BR_{3}	—	January 21, 1993	Oohira	T. Urata	·	4.7 km	MPC; JPL
11552 Boucolion	1993 BD_{4}	Boucolion	January 27, 1993	Caussols	E. W. Elst	L5	51 km	MPC; JPL
11553 Scheria	1993 BD_{6}	Scheria	January 27, 1993	Caussols	E. W. Elst	·	5.4 km	MPC; JPL
11554 Asios	1993 BZ_{12}	Asios	January 22, 1993	La Silla	E. W. Elst	L5	42 km	MPC; JPL
11555	1993 CR_{1}	—	February 15, 1993	Kushiro	S. Ueda, H. Kaneda	EUN	5.2 km	MPC; JPL
11556	1993 DV	—	February 21, 1993	Kushiro	S. Ueda, H. Kaneda	·	3.9 km	MPC; JPL
11557	1993 FO_{8}	—	March 17, 1993	La Silla	UESAC	·	3.8 km	MPC; JPL
11558	1993 FY_{8}	—	March 17, 1993	La Silla	UESAC	AGN	4.0 km	MPC; JPL
11559	1993 FS_{23}	—	March 21, 1993	La Silla	UESAC	·	4.9 km	MPC; JPL
11560	1993 FU_{24}	—	March 21, 1993	La Silla	UESAC	·	3.5 km	MPC; JPL
11561	1993 FZ_{24}	—	March 21, 1993	La Silla	UESAC	HOF	7.8 km	MPC; JPL
11562	1993 FU_{33}	—	March 19, 1993	La Silla	UESAC	·	10 km	MPC; JPL
11563	1993 FO_{36}	—	March 19, 1993	La Silla	UESAC	·	7.3 km	MPC; JPL
11564	1993 FU_{41}	—	March 19, 1993	La Silla	UESAC	(2076)	5.0 km	MPC; JPL
11565	1993 FD_{51}	—	March 19, 1993	La Silla	UESAC	·	4.6 km	MPC; JPL
11566	1993 FU_{51}	—	March 17, 1993	La Silla	UESAC	·	6.6 km	MPC; JPL
11567	1993 FF_{82}	—	March 19, 1993	La Silla	UESAC	HOF	14 km	MPC; JPL
11568	1993 GL	—	April 14, 1993	Kiyosato	S. Otomo	KOR	8.8 km	MPC; JPL
11569 Virgilsmith	1993 KB_{2}	Virgilsmith	May 27, 1993	Palomar	C. S. Shoemaker, D. H. Levy	·	24 km	MPC; JPL
11570	1993 LE	—	June 14, 1993	Palomar	H. E. Holt	EOS	11 km	MPC; JPL
11571 Daens	1993 OR_{8}	Daens	July 20, 1993	La Silla	E. W. Elst	·	6.0 km	MPC; JPL
11572 Schindler	1993 RM_{7}	Schindler	September 15, 1993	La Silla	E. W. Elst	MAS	2.4 km	MPC; JPL
11573 Helmholtz	1993 SK_{3}	Helmholtz	September 20, 1993	Tautenburg Observatory	F. Börngen, L. D. Schmadel	2:1J	10 km	MPC; JPL
11574 d'Alviella	1994 BP_{3}	d'Alviella	January 16, 1994	Caussols	E. W. Elst	·	6.5 km	MPC; JPL
11575 Claudio	1994 BN_{4}	Claudio	January 31, 1994	Farra d'Isonzo	Farra d'Isonzo	slow	5.3 km	MPC; JPL
11576	1994 CL	—	February 3, 1994	Ōizumi	T. Kobayashi	·	8.6 km	MPC; JPL
11577 Einasto	1994 CO_{17}	Einasto	February 8, 1994	La Silla	E. W. Elst	·	6.7 km	MPC; JPL
11578 Cimabue	1994 EB	Cimabue	March 4, 1994	Colleverde	V. S. Casulli	·	3.7 km	MPC; JPL
11579 Tsujitsuka	1994 JN	Tsujitsuka	May 6, 1994	Kitami	K. Endate, K. Watanabe	EUN	5.2 km	MPC; JPL
11580 Bautzen	1994 JG_{4}	Bautzen	May 3, 1994	Kitt Peak	Spacewatch	·	7.4 km	MPC; JPL
11581 Philipdejager	1994 PK_{9}	Philipdejager	August 10, 1994	La Silla	E. W. Elst	EOS	6.0 km	MPC; JPL
11582 Bleuler	1994 PC_{14}	Bleuler	August 10, 1994	La Silla	E. W. Elst	KOR	5.7 km	MPC; JPL
11583 Breuer	1994 PZ_{28}	Breuer	August 12, 1994	La Silla	E. W. Elst	·	3.5 km	MPC; JPL
11584 Ferenczi	1994 PP_{39}	Ferenczi	August 10, 1994	La Silla	E. W. Elst	EOS	6.0 km	MPC; JPL
11585 Orlandelassus	1994 RB_{17}	Orlandelassus	September 3, 1994	La Silla	E. W. Elst	KOR	6.3 km	MPC; JPL
11586	1994 UA_{2}	—	October 31, 1994	Kushiro	S. Ueda, H. Kaneda	EOS	8.2 km	MPC; JPL
11587	1994 UH_{2}	—	October 31, 1994	Kushiro	S. Ueda, H. Kaneda	THM	14 km	MPC; JPL
11588 Gottfriedkeller	1994 UZ_{12}	Gottfriedkeller	October 28, 1994	Tautenburg Observatory	F. Börngen	HYG	9.8 km	MPC; JPL
11589	1994 WG	—	November 25, 1994	Ōizumi	T. Kobayashi	CYB	20 km	MPC; JPL
11590	1994 WH_{3}	—	November 28, 1994	Kushiro	S. Ueda, H. Kaneda	·	15 km	MPC; JPL
11591	1995 FV	—	March 28, 1995	Ōizumi	T. Kobayashi	·	3.6 km	MPC; JPL
11592 Clintkelly	1995 FA_{7}	Clintkelly	March 23, 1995	Kitt Peak	Spacewatch	·	2.3 km	MPC; JPL
11593 Uchikawa	1995 HK	Uchikawa	April 20, 1995	Kitami	K. Endate, K. Watanabe	·	4.0 km	MPC; JPL
11594	1995 HP	—	April 27, 1995	Kushiro	S. Ueda, H. Kaneda	·	2.9 km	MPC; JPL
11595 Monsummano	1995 KN	Monsummano	May 23, 1995	San Marcello	A. Boattini, L. Tesi	·	3.2 km	MPC; JPL
11596 Francetic	1995 KA_{1}	Francetic	May 26, 1995	Catalina Station	T. B. Spahr	PHO	6.7 km	MPC; JPL
11597	1995 KL_{1}	—	May 31, 1995	Siding Spring	R. H. McNaught	PHO · slow	5.8 km	MPC; JPL
11598 Kubík	1995 OJ	Kubík	July 22, 1995	Ondřejov	L. Kotková	NYS	3.7 km	MPC; JPL
11599	1995 QR	—	August 16, 1995	Nachi-Katsuura	Y. Shimizu, T. Urata	NYS · slow	5.5 km	MPC; JPL
11600 Cipolla	1995 SQ_{2}	Cipolla	September 26, 1995	Stroncone	Santa Lucia	·	5.7 km	MPC; JPL

== 11601–11700 ==
back to top

Designation			Discovery			Properties		Ref
Permanent	Provisional	Named after	Date	Site	Discoverer(s)	Category	Diam.	Ref
11601	1995 SE_{4}	—	September 28, 1995	Church Stretton	S. P. Laurie	MAR · slow	5.2 km	MPC; JPL
11602 Miryang	1995 ST_{54}	Miryang	September 28, 1995	Socorro	R. Weber	ADE	8.3 km	MPC; JPL
11603	1995 TF	—	October 5, 1995	Kleť	Z. Moravec	·	4.4 km	MPC; JPL
11604 Novigrad	1995 UB_{1}	Novigrad	October 21, 1995	Višnjan Observatory	K. Korlević, Brcic, V.	EOS	7.6 km	MPC; JPL
11605 Ranfagni	1995 UP_{6}	Ranfagni	October 19, 1995	San Marcello	L. Tesi, A. Boattini	·	8.0 km	MPC; JPL
11606 Almary	1995 UU_{6}	Almary	October 19, 1995	Mauna Kea	D. J. Tholen	·	1.5 km	MPC; JPL
11607	1995 WX_{1}	—	November 16, 1995	Chichibu	N. Satō, T. Urata	·	16 km	MPC; JPL
11608	1995 WU_{4}	—	November 18, 1995	Nachi-Katsuura	Y. Shimizu, T. Urata	EUN	4.0 km	MPC; JPL
11609	1995 XT	—	December 12, 1995	Ōizumi	T. Kobayashi	THM	12 km	MPC; JPL
11610	1995 XJ_{1}	—	December 15, 1995	Ōizumi	T. Kobayashi	EOS	11 km	MPC; JPL
11611	1995 YQ	—	December 18, 1995	Haleakalā	NEAT	EOS ·	7.7 km	MPC; JPL
11612 Obu	1995 YZ_{1}	Obu	December 21, 1995	Kuma Kogen	A. Nakamura	·	6.5 km	MPC; JPL
11613	1995 YN_{4}	—	December 23, 1995	Nachi-Katsuura	Y. Shimizu, T. Urata	EOS	9.8 km	MPC; JPL
11614 Istropolitana	1996 AD_{2}	Istropolitana	January 14, 1996	Modra	A. Galád, Pravda, A.	EOS	6.2 km	MPC; JPL
11615 Naoya	1996 AE_{4}	Naoya	January 13, 1996	Kitami	K. Endate, K. Watanabe	THM	13 km	MPC; JPL
11616	1996 BQ_{2}	—	January 26, 1996	Ōizumi	T. Kobayashi	CYB	12 km	MPC; JPL
11617	1996 CL_{2}	—	February 12, 1996	Kushiro	S. Ueda, H. Kaneda	slow	8.4 km	MPC; JPL
11618	1996 EX_{1}	—	March 15, 1996	Haleakalā	NEAT	URS	14 km	MPC; JPL
11619	1996 GG_{17}	—	April 13, 1996	Kushiro	S. Ueda, H. Kaneda	·	6.6 km	MPC; JPL
11620 Susanagordon	1996 OE_{2}	Susanagordon	July 23, 1996	Campo Imperatore	A. Boattini, A. Di Paola	·	7.6 km	MPC; JPL
11621 Duccio	1996 PJ_{5}	Duccio	August 15, 1996	Montelupo	M. Tombelli, G. Forti	·	13 km	MPC; JPL
11622 Samuele	1996 RD_{4}	Samuele	September 9, 1996	San Marcello	A. Boattini, L. Tesi	·	8.1 km	MPC; JPL
11623 Kagekatu	1996 TC_{10}	Kagekatu	October 8, 1996	Nanyo	T. Okuni	·	3.5 km	MPC; JPL
11624	1996 UF	—	October 16, 1996	Ōizumi	T. Kobayashi	·	3.5 km	MPC; JPL
11625 Francelinda	1996 UL_{1}	Francelinda	October 20, 1996	San Marcello	L. Tesi, G. Cattani	·	8.3 km	MPC; JPL
11626 Church Stretton	1996 VW_{2}	Church Stretton	November 8, 1996	Church Stretton	S. P. Laurie	·	3.3 km	MPC; JPL
11627	1996 VT_{4}	—	November 13, 1996	Ōizumi	T. Kobayashi	·	4.1 km	MPC; JPL
11628 Katuhikoikeda	1996 VB_{5}	Katuhikoikeda	November 13, 1996	Moriyama	Ikari, Y.	fast	4.5 km	MPC; JPL
11629	1996 VY_{29}	—	November 7, 1996	Kushiro	S. Ueda, H. Kaneda	·	3.2 km	MPC; JPL
11630	1996 VY_{38}	—	November 7, 1996	Xinglong	SCAP	·	4.1 km	MPC; JPL
11631	1996 XV_{1}	—	December 2, 1996	Ōizumi	T. Kobayashi	V	3.5 km	MPC; JPL
11632	1996 XB_{3}	—	December 3, 1996	Ōizumi	T. Kobayashi	NYS	3.6 km	MPC; JPL
11633	1996 XG_{9}	—	December 2, 1996	Uccle	T. Pauwels	DOR	10 km	MPC; JPL
11634	1996 XU_{30}	—	December 12, 1996	Nachi-Katsuura	Y. Shimizu, T. Urata	·	2.3 km	MPC; JPL
11635	1996 XQ_{32}	—	December 6, 1996	Kushiro	S. Ueda, H. Kaneda	·	3.8 km	MPC; JPL
11636 Pezinok	1996 YH_{1}	Pezinok	December 27, 1996	Modra	A. Galád, Pravda, A.	·	2.6 km	MPC; JPL
11637 Yangjiachi	1996 YJ_{2}	Yangjiachi	December 24, 1996	Xinglong	SCAP	·	6.0 km	MPC; JPL
11638	1997 AH	—	January 2, 1997	Ōizumi	T. Kobayashi	·	7.4 km	MPC; JPL
11639	1997 AO_{4}	—	January 6, 1997	Ōizumi	T. Kobayashi	NEM	9.5 km	MPC; JPL
11640	1997 AT_{4}	—	January 6, 1997	Ōizumi	T. Kobayashi	·	3.4 km	MPC; JPL
11641	1997 AP_{12}	—	January 7, 1997	Nachi-Katsuura	Y. Shimizu, T. Urata	·	5.2 km	MPC; JPL
11642	1997 AN_{21}	—	January 13, 1997	Nachi-Katsuura	Y. Shimizu, T. Urata	EUN	4.6 km	MPC; JPL
11643	1997 AM_{22}	—	January 8, 1997	Xinglong	SCAP	·	5.3 km	MPC; JPL
11644	1997 BR_{1}	—	January 29, 1997	Ōizumi	T. Kobayashi	·	13 km	MPC; JPL
11645	1997 BY_{1}	—	January 29, 1997	Ōizumi	T. Kobayashi	·	8.9 km	MPC; JPL
11646	1997 BZ_{1}	—	January 29, 1997	Ōizumi	T. Kobayashi	·	3.3 km	MPC; JPL
11647	1997 BN_{3}	—	January 31, 1997	Ōizumi	T. Kobayashi	·	5.9 km	MPC; JPL
11648	1997 BT_{3}	—	January 31, 1997	Ōizumi	T. Kobayashi	KOR	6.5 km	MPC; JPL
11649	1997 BR_{6}	—	January 29, 1997	Nachi-Katsuura	Y. Shimizu, T. Urata	·	4.3 km	MPC; JPL
11650	1997 CN	—	February 1, 1997	Ōizumi	T. Kobayashi	·	5.0 km	MPC; JPL
11651	1997 CY	—	February 1, 1997	Ōizumi	T. Kobayashi	·	5.6 km	MPC; JPL
11652 Johnbrownlee	1997 CK_{13}	Johnbrownlee	February 7, 1997	Sormano	P. Sicoli, F. Manca	THM	15 km	MPC; JPL
11653	1997 CA_{20}	—	February 12, 1997	Ōizumi	T. Kobayashi	VER	13 km	MPC; JPL
11654	1997 CD_{20}	—	February 12, 1997	Ōizumi	T. Kobayashi	·	3.5 km	MPC; JPL
11655	1997 CC_{29}	—	February 7, 1997	Xinglong	SCAP	·	10 km	MPC; JPL
11656 Lipno	1997 EL_{6}	Lipno	March 6, 1997	Kleť	M. Tichý, Z. Moravec	·	10 km	MPC; JPL
11657 Antonhajduk	1997 EN_{7}	Antonhajduk	March 5, 1997	Modra	A. Galád, Pravda, A.	·	3.0 km	MPC; JPL
11658	1997 EQ_{17}	—	March 1, 1997	Kushiro	S. Ueda, H. Kaneda	·	12 km	MPC; JPL
11659	1997 EX_{41}	—	March 10, 1997	Socorro	LINEAR	·	13 km	MPC; JPL
11660	1997 FL_{2}	—	March 31, 1997	Socorro	LINEAR	NYS	5.7 km	MPC; JPL
11661	1997 FK_{4}	—	March 31, 1997	Socorro	LINEAR	GEF	5.3 km	MPC; JPL
11662	1997 GL_{23}	—	April 6, 1997	Socorro	LINEAR	fast	9.9 km	MPC; JPL
11663	1997 GO_{24}	—	April 7, 1997	Socorro	LINEAR	L5	31 km	MPC; JPL
11664 Kashiwagi	1997 GX_{24}	Kashiwagi	April 4, 1997	Kitami	K. Endate, K. Watanabe	THM	12 km	MPC; JPL
11665 Dirichlet	1997 GL_{28}	Dirichlet	April 14, 1997	Prescott	P. G. Comba	2:1J	6.8 km	MPC; JPL
11666 Bracker	1997 MD_{8}	Bracker	June 29, 1997	Kitt Peak	Spacewatch	·	4.4 km	MPC; JPL
11667 Testa	1997 UB_{1}	Testa	October 19, 1997	San Marcello	L. Tesi, A. Boattini	·	2.5 km	MPC; JPL
11668 Balios	1997 VV_{1}	Balios	November 3, 1997	Ondřejov	P. Pravec	L4	25 km	MPC; JPL
11669 Pascalscholl	1997 XY_{8}	Pascalscholl	December 7, 1997	Caussols	ODAS	·	6.1 km	MPC; JPL
11670 Fountain	1998 AU_{9}	Fountain	January 6, 1998	Anderson Mesa	M. W. Buie	THM	13 km	MPC; JPL
11671	1998 BG_{4}	—	January 21, 1998	Nachi-Katsuura	Y. Shimizu, T. Urata	·	4.8 km	MPC; JPL
11672 Cuney	1998 BC_{15}	Cuney	January 24, 1998	Haleakalā	NEAT	·	5.7 km	MPC; JPL
11673 Baur	1998 BJ_{19}	Baur	January 26, 1998	Farra d'Isonzo	Farra d'Isonzo	·	3.5 km	MPC; JPL
11674	1998 BN_{25}	—	January 28, 1998	Ōizumi	T. Kobayashi	·	3.8 km	MPC; JPL
11675 Billboyle	1998 CP_{2}	Billboyle	February 15, 1998	Bédoin	P. Antonini	·	4.8 km	MPC; JPL
11676	1998 CQ_{2}	—	February 6, 1998	Gekko	T. Kagawa	NYS ·	5.4 km	MPC; JPL
11677	1998 DY_{4}	—	February 22, 1998	Haleakalā	NEAT	·	3.8 km	MPC; JPL
11678 Brevard	1998 DT_{10}	Brevard	February 25, 1998	Cocoa	I. P. Griffin	·	3.7 km	MPC; JPL
11679 Brucebaker	1998 DE_{11}	Brucebaker	February 25, 1998	Haleakalā	NEAT	·	3.0 km	MPC; JPL
11680	1998 DT_{11}	—	February 24, 1998	Haleakalā	NEAT	·	4.3 km	MPC; JPL
11681 Ortner	1998 EP_{6}	Ortner	March 1, 1998	Caussols	ODAS	·	3.9 km	MPC; JPL
11682 Shiwaku	1998 EX_{6}	Shiwaku	March 3, 1998	Yatsuka	H. Abe	NYS	4.8 km	MPC; JPL
11683	1998 FO_{11}	—	March 22, 1998	Nachi-Katsuura	Y. Shimizu, T. Urata	·	13 km	MPC; JPL
11684	1998 FY_{11}	—	March 24, 1998	Haleakalā	NEAT	·	12 km	MPC; JPL
11685 Adamcurry	1998 FW_{19}	Adamcurry	March 20, 1998	Socorro	LINEAR	·	2.3 km	MPC; JPL
11686 Samuelweissman	1998 FU_{36}	Samuelweissman	March 20, 1998	Socorro	LINEAR	·	3.6 km	MPC; JPL
11687	1998 FM_{40}	—	March 20, 1998	Socorro	LINEAR	·	4.9 km	MPC; JPL
11688 Amandugan	1998 FG_{53}	Amandugan	March 20, 1998	Socorro	LINEAR	·	3.2 km	MPC; JPL
11689 Frankxu	1998 FA_{56}	Frankxu	March 20, 1998	Socorro	LINEAR	MAR	4.1 km	MPC; JPL
11690 Carodulaney	1998 FV_{60}	Carodulaney	March 20, 1998	Socorro	LINEAR	·	3.6 km	MPC; JPL
11691 Easterwood	1998 FO_{66}	Easterwood	March 20, 1998	Socorro	LINEAR	·	2.6 km	MPC; JPL
11692	1998 FV_{67}	—	March 20, 1998	Socorro	LINEAR	·	11 km	MPC; JPL
11693 Grantelliott	1998 FE_{69}	Grantelliott	March 20, 1998	Socorro	LINEAR	·	7.6 km	MPC; JPL
11694 Esterhuysen	1998 FO_{70}	Esterhuysen	March 20, 1998	Socorro	LINEAR	·	2.5 km	MPC; JPL
11695 Mattei	1998 FA_{74}	Mattei	March 22, 1998	Anderson Mesa	LONEOS	·	3.2 km	MPC; JPL
11696 Capen	1998 FD_{74}	Capen	March 22, 1998	Anderson Mesa	LONEOS	·	3.8 km	MPC; JPL
11697 Estrella	1998 FX_{98}	Estrella	March 31, 1998	Socorro	LINEAR	V	2.7 km	MPC; JPL
11698 Fichtelman	1998 FZ_{102}	Fichtelman	March 31, 1998	Socorro	LINEAR	·	3.5 km	MPC; JPL
11699	1998 FL_{105}	—	March 31, 1998	Socorro	LINEAR	·	6.4 km	MPC; JPL
11700	1998 FT_{115}	—	March 31, 1998	Socorro	LINEAR	·	10 km	MPC; JPL

== 11701–11800 ==
back to top

Designation			Discovery			Properties		Ref
Permanent	Provisional	Named after	Date	Site	Discoverer(s)	Category	Diam.	Ref
11701 Madeleineyang	1998 FY_{116}	Madeleineyang	March 31, 1998	Socorro	LINEAR	·	6.4 km	MPC; JPL
11702 Mifischer	1998 FE_{117}	Mifischer	March 31, 1998	Socorro	LINEAR	·	3.1 km	MPC; JPL
11703 Glassman	1998 FL_{121}	Glassman	March 20, 1998	Socorro	LINEAR	·	4.3 km	MPC; JPL
11704 Gorin	1998 FZ_{130}	Gorin	March 22, 1998	Socorro	LINEAR	V	2.7 km	MPC; JPL
11705	1998 GN_{7}	—	April 2, 1998	Socorro	LINEAR	EUN	9.6 km	MPC; JPL
11706 Rijeka	1998 HV_{4}	Rijeka	April 20, 1998	Višnjan Observatory	K. Korlević, M. Dusić	KOR	4.9 km	MPC; JPL
11707 Grigery	1998 HW_{17}	Grigery	April 18, 1998	Socorro	LINEAR	·	3.3 km	MPC; JPL
11708 Kathyfries	1998 HT_{19}	Kathyfries	April 18, 1998	Socorro	LINEAR	·	2.1 km	MPC; JPL
11709 Eudoxos	1998 HF_{20}	Eudoxos	April 27, 1998	Prescott	P. G. Comba	·	4.5 km	MPC; JPL
11710 Nataliehale	1998 HS_{34}	Nataliehale	April 20, 1998	Socorro	LINEAR	·	6.7 km	MPC; JPL
11711 Urquiza	1998 HV_{50}	Urquiza	April 25, 1998	Anderson Mesa	LONEOS	·	3.8 km	MPC; JPL
11712 Kemcook	1998 HB_{51}	Kemcook	April 25, 1998	Anderson Mesa	LONEOS	·	4.7 km	MPC; JPL
11713 Stubbs	1998 HG_{51}	Stubbs	April 25, 1998	Anderson Mesa	LONEOS	·	11 km	MPC; JPL
11714 Mikebrown	1998 HQ_{51}	Mikebrown	April 28, 1998	Anderson Mesa	LONEOS	·	4.5 km	MPC; JPL
11715 Harperclark	1998 HA_{75}	Harperclark	April 21, 1998	Socorro	LINEAR	·	4.3 km	MPC; JPL
11716 Amahartman	1998 HY_{79}	Amahartman	April 21, 1998	Socorro	LINEAR	·	4.7 km	MPC; JPL
11717	1998 HU_{94}	—	April 21, 1998	Socorro	LINEAR	THM	15 km	MPC; JPL
11718 Hayward	1998 HD_{95}	Hayward	April 21, 1998	Socorro	LINEAR	·	4.1 km	MPC; JPL
11719 Hicklen	1998 HT_{98}	Hicklen	April 21, 1998	Socorro	LINEAR	·	4.9 km	MPC; JPL
11720 Horodyskyj	1998 HZ_{99}	Horodyskyj	April 21, 1998	Socorro	LINEAR	·	4.2 km	MPC; JPL
11721 Shawnlowe	1998 HE_{100}	Shawnlowe	April 21, 1998	Socorro	LINEAR	GEF	4.8 km	MPC; JPL
11722	1998 HR_{115}	—	April 23, 1998	Socorro	LINEAR	EOS	8.0 km	MPC; JPL
11723 Briankennedy	1998 HT_{125}	Briankennedy	April 23, 1998	Socorro	LINEAR	·	5.3 km	MPC; JPL
11724 Ronaldhsu	1998 HH_{146}	Ronaldhsu	April 21, 1998	Socorro	LINEAR	·	3.3 km	MPC; JPL
11725 Victoriahsu	1998 HM_{146}	Victoriahsu	April 21, 1998	Socorro	LINEAR	·	3.6 km	MPC; JPL
11726 Edgerton	1998 JA	Edgerton	May 1, 1998	Lime Creek	R. Linderholm	·	16 km	MPC; JPL
11727 Sweet	1998 JM_{1}	Sweet	May 1, 1998	Haleakalā	NEAT	·	4.3 km	MPC; JPL
11728 Einer	1998 JC_{2}	Einer	May 1, 1998	Haleakalā	NEAT	KOR	5.8 km	MPC; JPL
11729	1998 KD_{22}	—	May 22, 1998	Socorro	LINEAR	THM	17 km	MPC; JPL
11730 Yanhua	1998 KO_{31}	Yanhua	May 22, 1998	Socorro	LINEAR	·	3.1 km	MPC; JPL
11731	1998 KF_{47}	—	May 22, 1998	Socorro	LINEAR	(3460)	15 km	MPC; JPL
11732	1998 KX_{48}	—	May 23, 1998	Socorro	LINEAR	EOS · slow ·	11 km	MPC; JPL
11733	1998 KJ_{52}	—	May 23, 1998	Socorro	LINEAR	·	8.8 km	MPC; JPL
11734	1998 KM_{55}	—	May 23, 1998	Socorro	LINEAR	EUN	7.7 km	MPC; JPL
11735 Isabellecohen	1998 KN_{56}	Isabellecohen	May 22, 1998	Socorro	LINEAR	·	4.6 km	MPC; JPL
11736 Viktorfischl	1998 QS_{1}	Viktorfischl	August 19, 1998	Ondřejov	L. Kotková	NYS	6.8 km	MPC; JPL
11737 Gregneat	1998 QL_{24}	Gregneat	August 17, 1998	Socorro	LINEAR	slow	6.3 km	MPC; JPL
11738	1998 RK_{72}	—	September 14, 1998	Socorro	LINEAR	THM	18 km	MPC; JPL
11739 Baton Rouge	1998 SG_{27}	Baton Rouge	September 25, 1998	Baton Rouge	W. R. Cooney Jr., Collier, M.	T_{j} (2.97) · 3:2	17 km	MPC; JPL
11740 Georgesmith	1998 UK_{6}	Georgesmith	October 22, 1998	Caussols	ODAS	KOR	5.9 km	MPC; JPL
11741	1999 AZ_{3}	—	January 10, 1999	Ōizumi	T. Kobayashi	KOR	6.0 km	MPC; JPL
11742	1999 JZ_{5}	—	May 7, 1999	Nachi-Katsuura	Y. Shimizu, T. Urata	HOF	11 km	MPC; JPL
11743 Jachowski	1999 JP_{130}	Jachowski	May 13, 1999	Socorro	LINEAR	NYS	4.4 km	MPC; JPL
11744	1999 NQ_{2}	—	July 9, 1999	Oohira	T. Urata	·	3.6 km	MPC; JPL
11745	1999 NH_{3}	—	July 13, 1999	Socorro	LINEAR	EUN	8.2 km	MPC; JPL
11746 Thomjansen	1999 NG_{4}	Thomjansen	July 13, 1999	Socorro	LINEAR	·	2.8 km	MPC; JPL
11747 Libbykamen	1999 NQ_{9}	Libbykamen	July 13, 1999	Socorro	LINEAR	·	5.9 km	MPC; JPL
11748	1999 NT_{10}	—	July 13, 1999	Socorro	LINEAR	·	4.4 km	MPC; JPL
11749	1999 NZ_{10}	—	July 13, 1999	Socorro	LINEAR	KOR	6.7 km	MPC; JPL
11750	1999 NM_{33}	—	July 14, 1999	Socorro	LINEAR	3:2	18 km	MPC; JPL
11751 Davidcarroll	1999 NK_{37}	Davidcarroll	July 14, 1999	Socorro	LINEAR	·	8.0 km	MPC; JPL
11752 Masatakesagai	1999 OU_{3}	Masatakesagai	July 23, 1999	Nanyo	T. Okuni	EUN	4.9 km	MPC; JPL
11753 Geoffburbidge	2064 P-L	Geoffburbidge	September 24, 1960	Palomar	C. J. van Houten, I. van Houten-Groeneveld, T. Gehrels	HYG	7.9 km	MPC; JPL
11754 Herbig	2560 P-L	Herbig	September 24, 1960	Palomar	C. J. van Houten, I. van Houten-Groeneveld, T. Gehrels	·	7.7 km	MPC; JPL
11755 Paczyński	2691 P-L	Paczyński	September 24, 1960	Palomar	C. J. van Houten, I. van Houten-Groeneveld, T. Gehrels	NYS	2.9 km	MPC; JPL
11756 Geneparker	2779 P-L	Geneparker	September 24, 1960	Palomar	C. J. van Houten, I. van Houten-Groeneveld, T. Gehrels	·	3.1 km	MPC; JPL
11757 Salpeter	2799 P-L	Salpeter	September 24, 1960	Palomar	C. J. van Houten, I. van Houten-Groeneveld, T. Gehrels	T_{j} (2.97)	6.7 km	MPC; JPL
11758 Sargent	4035 P-L	Sargent	September 24, 1960	Palomar	C. J. van Houten, I. van Houten-Groeneveld, T. Gehrels	HYG	8.9 km	MPC; JPL
11759 Sunyaev	4075 P-L	Sunyaev	September 24, 1960	Palomar	C. J. van Houten, I. van Houten-Groeneveld, T. Gehrels	·	3.1 km	MPC; JPL
11760 Auwers	4090 P-L	Auwers	September 24, 1960	Palomar	C. J. van Houten, I. van Houten-Groeneveld, T. Gehrels	·	5.7 km	MPC; JPL
11761 Davidgill	4868 P-L	Davidgill	September 24, 1960	Palomar	C. J. van Houten, I. van Houten-Groeneveld, T. Gehrels	·	6.9 km	MPC; JPL
11762 Vogel	6044 P-L	Vogel	September 24, 1960	Palomar	C. J. van Houten, I. van Houten-Groeneveld, T. Gehrels	KOR	5.9 km	MPC; JPL
11763 Deslandres	6303 P-L	Deslandres	September 24, 1960	Palomar	C. J. van Houten, I. van Houten-Groeneveld, T. Gehrels	KOR	4.5 km	MPC; JPL
11764 Benbaillaud	6531 P-L	Benbaillaud	September 24, 1960	Palomar	C. J. van Houten, I. van Houten-Groeneveld, T. Gehrels	·	3.1 km	MPC; JPL
11765 Alfredfowler	9057 P-L	Alfredfowler	October 17, 1960	Palomar	C. J. van Houten, I. van Houten-Groeneveld, T. Gehrels	·	3.8 km	MPC; JPL
11766 Fredseares	9073 P-L	Fredseares	October 17, 1960	Palomar	C. J. van Houten, I. van Houten-Groeneveld, T. Gehrels	HYG	14 km	MPC; JPL
11767 Milne	3224 T-1	Milne	March 26, 1971	Palomar	C. J. van Houten, I. van Houten-Groeneveld, T. Gehrels	·	2.6 km	MPC; JPL
11768 Merrill	4107 T-1	Merrill	March 26, 1971	Palomar	C. J. van Houten, I. van Houten-Groeneveld, T. Gehrels	VER	12 km	MPC; JPL
11769 Alfredjoy	2199 T-2	Alfredjoy	September 29, 1973	Palomar	C. J. van Houten, I. van Houten-Groeneveld, T. Gehrels	·	2.8 km	MPC; JPL
11770 Rudominkowski	3163 T-2	Rudominkowski	September 30, 1973	Palomar	C. J. van Houten, I. van Houten-Groeneveld, T. Gehrels	·	11 km	MPC; JPL
11771 Maestlin	4136 T-2	Maestlin	September 29, 1973	Palomar	C. J. van Houten, I. van Houten-Groeneveld, T. Gehrels	·	7.6 km	MPC; JPL
11772 Jacoblemaire	4210 T-2	Jacoblemaire	September 29, 1973	Palomar	C. J. van Houten, I. van Houten-Groeneveld, T. Gehrels	·	4.1 km	MPC; JPL
11773 Schouten	1021 T-3	Schouten	October 17, 1977	Palomar	C. J. van Houten, I. van Houten-Groeneveld, T. Gehrels	·	5.4 km	MPC; JPL
11774 Jerne	1128 T-3	Jerne	October 17, 1977	Palomar	C. J. van Houten, I. van Houten-Groeneveld, T. Gehrels	slow	12 km	MPC; JPL
11775 Köhler	3224 T-3	Köhler	October 16, 1977	Palomar	C. J. van Houten, I. van Houten-Groeneveld, T. Gehrels	·	2.8 km	MPC; JPL
11776 Milstein	3460 T-3	Milstein	October 16, 1977	Palomar	C. J. van Houten, I. van Houten-Groeneveld, T. Gehrels	THM	11 km	MPC; JPL
11777 Hargrave	3526 T-3	Hargrave	October 16, 1977	Palomar	C. J. van Houten, I. van Houten-Groeneveld, T. Gehrels	NYS	2.2 km	MPC; JPL
11778 Kingsford Smith	4102 T-3	Kingsford Smith	October 16, 1977	Palomar	C. J. van Houten, I. van Houten-Groeneveld, T. Gehrels	·	2.8 km	MPC; JPL
11779 Zernike	4197 T-3	Zernike	October 16, 1977	Palomar	C. J. van Houten, I. van Houten-Groeneveld, T. Gehrels	·	4.7 km	MPC; JPL
11780 Thunder Bay	1942 TB	Thunder Bay	October 3, 1942	Turku	L. Oterma	slow	5.6 km	MPC; JPL
11781 Alexroberts	1966 PL	Alexroberts	August 7, 1966	Bloemfontein	Boyden Observatory	V	3.8 km	MPC; JPL
11782 Nikolajivanov	1969 TT_{1}	Nikolajivanov	October 8, 1969	Nauchnij	L. I. Chernykh	·	3.3 km	MPC; JPL
11783	1971 UN_{1}	—	October 26, 1971	Hamburg-Bergedorf	L. Kohoutek	THM	9.8 km	MPC; JPL
11784	1971 UT_{1}	—	October 26, 1971	Hamburg-Bergedorf	L. Kohoutek	·	12 km	MPC; JPL
11785 Migaic	1973 AW_{3}	Migaic	January 2, 1973	Nauchnij	N. S. Chernykh	·	15 km	MPC; JPL
11786 Bakhchivandji	1977 QW	Bakhchivandji	August 19, 1977	Nauchnij	N. S. Chernykh	·	10 km	MPC; JPL
11787 Baumanka	1977 QF_{1}	Baumanka	August 19, 1977	Nauchnij	N. S. Chernykh	EUN	8.0 km	MPC; JPL
11788 Nauchnyj	1977 QN_{2}	Nauchnyj	August 21, 1977	Nauchnij	N. S. Chernykh	·	2.7 km	MPC; JPL
11789 Kempowski	1977 RK	Kempowski	September 5, 1977	La Silla	H.-E. Schuster	H	2.2 km	MPC; JPL
11790 Goode	1978 RU	Goode	September 1, 1978	Nauchnij	N. S. Chernykh	·	5.1 km	MPC; JPL
11791 Sofiyavarzar	1978 SH_{7}	Sofiyavarzar	September 26, 1978	Nauchnij	L. V. Zhuravleva	·	4.3 km	MPC; JPL
11792 Sidorovsky	1978 SX_{7}	Sidorovsky	September 26, 1978	Nauchnij	L. V. Zhuravleva	(5)	5.9 km	MPC; JPL
11793 Chujkovia	1978 TH_{7}	Chujkovia	October 2, 1978	Nauchnij	L. V. Zhuravleva	EMA	15 km	MPC; JPL
11794 Yokokebukawa	1978 VW_{8}	Yokokebukawa	November 7, 1978	Palomar	E. F. Helin, S. J. Bus	THM	11 km	MPC; JPL
11795 Fredrikbruhn	1979 QM_{1}	Fredrikbruhn	August 22, 1979	La Silla	C.-I. Lagerkvist	·	5.8 km	MPC; JPL
11796 Nirenberg	1980 DS_{4}	Nirenberg	February 21, 1980	Nauchnij	L. G. Karachkina	·	7.9 km	MPC; JPL
11797 Warell	1980 FV_{2}	Warell	March 16, 1980	La Silla	C.-I. Lagerkvist	EUN	6.1 km	MPC; JPL
11798 Davidsson	1980 FH_{5}	Davidsson	March 16, 1980	La Silla	C.-I. Lagerkvist	EUN	4.7 km	MPC; JPL
11799 Lantz	1981 DG_{2}	Lantz	February 28, 1981	Siding Spring	S. J. Bus	·	10 km	MPC; JPL
11800 Carrozzo	1981 DN_{2}	Carrozzo	February 28, 1981	Siding Spring	S. J. Bus	EOS	6.4 km	MPC; JPL

== 11801–11900 ==
back to top

Designation			Discovery			Properties		Ref
Permanent	Provisional	Named after	Date	Site	Discoverer(s)	Category	Diam.	Ref
11801 Frigeri	1981 EL_{5}	Frigeri	March 2, 1981	Siding Spring	S. J. Bus	EOS · fast?	8.6 km	MPC; JPL
11802 Ivanovski	1981 EP_{12}	Ivanovski	March 1, 1981	Siding Spring	S. J. Bus	·	3.2 km	MPC; JPL
11803 Turrini	1981 ES_{12}	Turrini	March 1, 1981	Siding Spring	S. J. Bus	·	5.8 km	MPC; JPL
11804 Zambon	1981 EE_{13}	Zambon	March 1, 1981	Siding Spring	S. J. Bus	·	4.0 km	MPC; JPL
11805 Novaković	1981 EL_{13}	Novaković	March 1, 1981	Siding Spring	S. J. Bus	EOS	5.1 km	MPC; JPL
11806 Thangjam	1981 EF_{14}	Thangjam	March 1, 1981	Siding Spring	S. J. Bus	·	2.3 km	MPC; JPL
11807 Wannberg	1981 EH_{17}	Wannberg	March 1, 1981	Siding Spring	S. J. Bus	·	5.9 km	MPC; JPL
11808 Platz	1981 EM_{17}	Platz	March 1, 1981	Siding Spring	S. J. Bus	·	4.6 km	MPC; JPL
11809 Shinnaka	1981 EG_{18}	Shinnaka	March 2, 1981	Siding Spring	S. J. Bus	·	2.1 km	MPC; JPL
11810 Preusker	1981 EV_{18}	Preusker	March 2, 1981	Siding Spring	S. J. Bus	·	5.0 km	MPC; JPL
11811 Martinrubin	1981 EH_{19}	Martinrubin	March 2, 1981	Siding Spring	S. J. Bus	·	2.7 km	MPC; JPL
11812 Dongqiao	1981 EL_{20}	Dongqiao	March 2, 1981	Siding Spring	S. J. Bus	EOS	6.2 km	MPC; JPL
11813 Ingorichter	1981 EQ_{23}	Ingorichter	March 3, 1981	Siding Spring	S. J. Bus	(1298)	9.8 km	MPC; JPL
11814 Schwamb	1981 EW_{26}	Schwamb	March 2, 1981	Siding Spring	S. J. Bus	·	8.9 km	MPC; JPL
11815 Viikinkoski	1981 EG_{31}	Viikinkoski	March 2, 1981	Siding Spring	S. J. Bus	·	3.7 km	MPC; JPL
11816 Vasile	1981 EX_{32}	Vasile	March 1, 1981	Siding Spring	S. J. Bus	RAF	3.0 km	MPC; JPL
11817 Oguri	1981 EQ_{34}	Oguri	March 2, 1981	Siding Spring	S. J. Bus	·	3.8 km	MPC; JPL
11818 Ulamec	1981 EK_{35}	Ulamec	March 2, 1981	Siding Spring	S. J. Bus	·	6.1 km	MPC; JPL
11819 Millarca	1981 ER_{35}	Millarca	March 2, 1981	Siding Spring	S. J. Bus	·	5.0 km	MPC; JPL
11820 Mikiyasato	1981 EP_{38}	Mikiyasato	March 1, 1981	Siding Spring	S. J. Bus	EOS	5.4 km	MPC; JPL
11821 Coleman	1981 EG_{44}	Coleman	March 6, 1981	Siding Spring	S. J. Bus	EOS	7.4 km	MPC; JPL
11822	1981 TK	—	October 6, 1981	Kleť	Z. Vávrová	PHO	4.6 km	MPC; JPL
11823 Christen	1981 VF	Christen	November 2, 1981	Anderson Mesa	B. A. Skiff	·	4.1 km	MPC; JPL
11824 Alpaidze	1982 SO_{5}	Alpaidze	September 16, 1982	Nauchnij	L. I. Chernykh	·	4.5 km	MPC; JPL
11825	1982 UW_{1}	—	October 16, 1982	Kleť	A. Mrkos	·	18 km	MPC; JPL
11826 Yurijgromov	1982 UR_{10}	Yurijgromov	October 25, 1982	Nauchnij	L. V. Zhuravleva	THM	7.6 km	MPC; JPL
11827 Wasyuzan	1982 VD_{5}	Wasyuzan	November 14, 1982	Kiso	H. Kosai, K. Furukawa	·	4.4 km	MPC; JPL
11828 Vargha	1984 DZ	Vargha	February 26, 1984	La Silla	H. Debehogne	·	4.8 km	MPC; JPL
11829 Tuvikene	1984 EU_{1}	Tuvikene	March 4, 1984	La Silla	H. Debehogne	·	3.4 km	MPC; JPL
11830 Jessenius	1984 JE	Jessenius	May 2, 1984	Kleť	A. Mrkos	·	3.5 km	MPC; JPL
11831 Chaple	1984 SF_{3}	Chaple	September 28, 1984	Anderson Mesa	B. A. Skiff	·	11 km	MPC; JPL
11832 Pustylnik	1984 SC_{6}	Pustylnik	September 21, 1984	La Silla	H. Debehogne	NYS	3.6 km	MPC; JPL
11833 Dixon	1985 RW	Dixon	September 13, 1985	Kitt Peak	Spacewatch	H	1.8 km	MPC; JPL
11834	1985 RQ_{3}	—	September 7, 1985	La Silla	H. Debehogne	·	6.8 km	MPC; JPL
11835	1985 RA_{4}	—	September 10, 1985	La Silla	H. Debehogne	·	7.2 km	MPC; JPL
11836 Eileen	1986 CB	Eileen	February 5, 1986	Palomar	C. S. Shoemaker, E. M. Shoemaker	·	6.5 km	MPC; JPL
11837	1986 GD	—	April 2, 1986	Brorfelde	P. Jensen	·	4.8 km	MPC; JPL
11838	1986 PJ_{1}	—	August 1, 1986	Palomar	E. F. Helin	·	3.2 km	MPC; JPL
11839	1986 QX_{1}	—	August 27, 1986	La Silla	H. Debehogne	·	4.1 km	MPC; JPL
11840	1986 QR_{2}	—	August 28, 1986	La Silla	H. Debehogne	·	8.7 km	MPC; JPL
11841	1986 VW	—	November 3, 1986	Kleť	A. Mrkos	·	3.3 km	MPC; JPL
11842 Kap'bos	1987 BR_{1}	Kap'bos	January 22, 1987	La Silla	E. W. Elst	·	4.0 km	MPC; JPL
11843	1987 DM_{6}	—	February 23, 1987	La Silla	H. Debehogne	·	2.9 km	MPC; JPL
11844 Ostwald	1987 QW_{2}	Ostwald	August 22, 1987	La Silla	E. W. Elst	THM	11 km	MPC; JPL
11845	1987 RZ	—	September 12, 1987	La Silla	H. Debehogne	THM	10 km	MPC; JPL
11846 Verminnen	1987 SE_{3}	Verminnen	September 21, 1987	Smolyan	E. W. Elst	·	4.1 km	MPC; JPL
11847 Winckelmann	1988 BY_{2}	Winckelmann	January 20, 1988	Tautenburg Observatory	F. Börngen	·	9.9 km	MPC; JPL
11848 Paullouka	1988 CW_{2}	Paullouka	February 11, 1988	La Silla	E. W. Elst	·	7.5 km	MPC; JPL
11849 Fauvel	1988 CF_{7}	Fauvel	February 15, 1988	La Silla	E. W. Elst	·	4.8 km	MPC; JPL
11850	1988 EY_{1}	—	March 13, 1988	Brorfelde	P. Jensen	EUN	5.1 km	MPC; JPL
11851	1988 PD_{1}	—	August 14, 1988	Palomar	Palomar	PHO	4.0 km	MPC; JPL
11852 Shoumen	1988 RD	Shoumen	September 10, 1988	Smolyan	V. G. Shkodrov, V. G. Ivanova	PHO	6.7 km	MPC; JPL
11853 Runge	1988 RV_{1}	Runge	September 7, 1988	Tautenburg Observatory	F. Börngen	·	4.9 km	MPC; JPL
11854 Ludwigrichter	1988 RM_{3}	Ludwigrichter	September 8, 1988	Tautenburg Observatory	F. Börngen	·	3.6 km	MPC; JPL
11855 Preller	1988 RS_{3}	Preller	September 8, 1988	Tautenburg Observatory	F. Börngen	NYS	3.7 km	MPC; JPL
11856 Nicolabonev	1988 RM_{8}	Nicolabonev	September 11, 1988	Smolyan	V. G. Ivanova, V. G. Shkodrov	·	4.6 km	MPC; JPL
11857	1988 RK_{9}	—	September 1, 1988	La Silla	H. Debehogne	·	10 km	MPC; JPL
11858 Devinpoland	1988 RC_{11}	Devinpoland	September 14, 1988	Cerro Tololo	S. J. Bus	THM	9.6 km	MPC; JPL
11859 Danngarcia	1988 SN_{1}	Danngarcia	September 16, 1988	Cerro Tololo	S. J. Bus	·	4.1 km	MPC; JPL
11860 Uedasatoshi	1988 UP	Uedasatoshi	October 16, 1988	Kitami	K. Endate, K. Watanabe	THM	12 km	MPC; JPL
11861 Teruhime	1988 VY_{2}	Teruhime	November 10, 1988	Chiyoda	T. Kojima	·	12 km	MPC; JPL
11862	1988 XB_{2}	—	December 7, 1988	Gekko	Y. Oshima	·	3.6 km	MPC; JPL
11863	1989 EX	—	March 8, 1989	Okutama	Hioki, T., N. Kawasato	·	6.9 km	MPC; JPL
11864	1989 NH_{1}	—	July 10, 1989	Palomar	Zeigler, K. W.	·	4.0 km	MPC; JPL
11865 Nakamuramasatsug	1989 SC	Nakamuramasatsug	September 23, 1989	Kani	Y. Mizuno, T. Furuta	·	2.6 km	MPC; JPL
11866	1989 SL_{12}	—	September 30, 1989	La Silla	H. Debehogne	·	3.8 km	MPC; JPL
11867	1989 TW	—	October 4, 1989	Toyota	K. Suzuki, T. Furuta	·	3.1 km	MPC; JPL
11868 Kleinrichert	1989 TY	Kleinrichert	October 2, 1989	McGraw-Hill	R. P. Binzel	·	6.1 km	MPC; JPL
11869	1989 TS_{2}	—	October 3, 1989	Cerro Tololo	S. J. Bus	L5	27 km	MPC; JPL
11870 Sverige	1989 TC_{3}	Sverige	October 7, 1989	La Silla	E. W. Elst	·	7.0 km	MPC; JPL
11871 Norge	1989 TP_{7}	Norge	October 7, 1989	La Silla	E. W. Elst	·	2.8 km	MPC; JPL
11872	1989 WR	—	November 20, 1989	Kushiro	S. Ueda, H. Kaneda	·	3.7 km	MPC; JPL
11873 Kokuseibi	1989 WS_{2}	Kokuseibi	November 30, 1989	Kushiro	Matsuyama, M., K. Watanabe	·	4.9 km	MPC; JPL
11874 Gringauz	1989 XD_{1}	Gringauz	December 2, 1989	La Silla	E. W. Elst	fast	3.1 km	MPC; JPL
11875 Rhône	1989 YG_{5}	Rhône	December 28, 1989	Haute-Provence	E. W. Elst	·	22 km	MPC; JPL
11876 Doncarpenter	1990 EM_{1}	Doncarpenter	March 2, 1990	La Silla	E. W. Elst	V	3.1 km	MPC; JPL
11877	1990 EL_{8}	—	March 5, 1990	La Silla	H. Debehogne	·	5.0 km	MPC; JPL
11878 Hanamiyama	1990 HJ	Hanamiyama	April 18, 1990	Geisei	T. Seki	·	3.5 km	MPC; JPL
11879	1990 QR_{1}	—	August 22, 1990	Palomar	H. E. Holt	AST	8.2 km	MPC; JPL
11880	1990 QQ_{4}	—	August 24, 1990	Palomar	H. E. Holt	·	8.6 km	MPC; JPL
11881 Mirstation	1990 QO_{6}	Mirstation	August 20, 1990	La Silla	E. W. Elst	EUN	4.0 km	MPC; JPL
11882	1990 RA_{3}	—	September 14, 1990	Palomar	H. E. Holt	(11882)	3.3 km	MPC; JPL
11883	1990 RD_{5}	—	September 15, 1990	Palomar	H. E. Holt	PAD	9.0 km	MPC; JPL
11884	1990 RD_{6}	—	September 8, 1990	La Silla	H. Debehogne	EUN	7.1 km	MPC; JPL
11885 Summanus	1990 SS	Summanus	September 25, 1990	Kitt Peak	Spacewatch	APO +1km	1.3 km	MPC; JPL
11886 Kraske	1990 TT_{10}	Kraske	October 10, 1990	Tautenburg Observatory	L. D. Schmadel, F. Börngen	·	6.7 km	MPC; JPL
11887 Echemmon	1990 TV_{12}	Echemmon	October 14, 1990	Tautenburg Observatory	F. Börngen, L. D. Schmadel	L5	31 km	MPC; JPL
11888	1990 UD_{3}	—	October 19, 1990	Dynic	A. Sugie	CLO · slow	7.9 km	MPC; JPL
11889	1991 AH_{2}	—	January 7, 1991	Siding Spring	R. H. McNaught	·	10 km	MPC; JPL
11890	1991 FF	—	March 18, 1991	Siding Spring	R. H. McNaught	·	8.7 km	MPC; JPL
11891	1991 FJ_{2}	—	March 20, 1991	La Silla	H. Debehogne	·	3.1 km	MPC; JPL
11892	1991 FT_{2}	—	March 20, 1991	La Silla	H. Debehogne	·	2.8 km	MPC; JPL
11893	1991 FZ_{2}	—	March 20, 1991	La Silla	H. Debehogne	·	9.7 km	MPC; JPL
11894	1991 GW	—	April 3, 1991	Uenohara	N. Kawasato	·	7.3 km	MPC; JPL
11895 Dehant	1991 GU_{3}	Dehant	April 8, 1991	La Silla	E. W. Elst	·	4.0 km	MPC; JPL
11896 Camelbeeck	1991 GP_{6}	Camelbeeck	April 8, 1991	La Silla	E. W. Elst	NYS	3.4 km	MPC; JPL
11897 Lemaire	1991 GC_{7}	Lemaire	April 8, 1991	La Silla	E. W. Elst	·	3.6 km	MPC; JPL
11898 Dedeyn	1991 GM_{9}	Dedeyn	April 10, 1991	La Silla	E. W. Elst	THM	11 km	MPC; JPL
11899 Weill	1991 GJ_{10}	Weill	April 9, 1991	Tautenburg Observatory	F. Börngen	VER	13 km	MPC; JPL
11900 Spinoy	1991 LV_{2}	Spinoy	June 6, 1991	La Silla	E. W. Elst	NYS	2.9 km	MPC; JPL

== 11901–12000 ==
back to top

Designation			Discovery			Properties		Ref
Permanent	Provisional	Named after	Date	Site	Discoverer(s)	Category	Diam.	Ref
11901	1991 PV_{11}	—	August 7, 1991	Palomar	H. E. Holt	PHO	5.3 km	MPC; JPL
11902	1991 PZ_{12}	—	August 5, 1991	Palomar	H. E. Holt	V	3.5 km	MPC; JPL
11903	1991 RD_{7}	—	September 2, 1991	Siding Spring	R. H. McNaught	·	6.8 km	MPC; JPL
11904	1991 TR_{1}	—	October 13, 1991	Palomar	K. J. Lawrence	H	2.1 km	MPC; JPL
11905 Giacometti	1991 VL_{6}	Giacometti	November 6, 1991	La Silla	E. W. Elst	EUN	4.0 km	MPC; JPL
11906	1992 AE_{1}	—	January 10, 1992	Okutama	Hioki, T., Hayakawa, S.	·	5.3 km	MPC; JPL
11907 Näränen	1992 ER_{8}	Näränen	March 2, 1992	La Silla	UESAC	KOR	5.4 km	MPC; JPL
11908 Nicaragua	1992 GC_{5}	Nicaragua	April 4, 1992	La Silla	E. W. Elst	·	8.8 km	MPC; JPL
11909	1992 HD_{5}	—	April 25, 1992	La Silla	H. Debehogne	·	17 km	MPC; JPL
11910	1992 KJ	—	May 28, 1992	Kiyosato	S. Otomo	·	3.5 km	MPC; JPL
11911 Angel	1992 LF	Angel	June 4, 1992	Palomar	C. S. Shoemaker, D. H. Levy	LUT ·	27 km	MPC; JPL
11912 Piedade	1992 OP_{5}	Piedade	July 30, 1992	La Silla	E. W. Elst	·	4.1 km	MPC; JPL
11913 Svarna	1992 RD_{3}	Svarna	September 2, 1992	La Silla	E. W. Elst	(2076)	2.8 km	MPC; JPL
11914 Sinachopoulos	1992 RZ_{3}	Sinachopoulos	September 2, 1992	La Silla	E. W. Elst	·	2.5 km	MPC; JPL
11915 Nishiinoue	1992 SJ_{1}	Nishiinoue	September 23, 1992	Kitami	K. Endate, K. Watanabe	·	3.6 km	MPC; JPL
11916 Wiesloch	1992 ST_{17}	Wiesloch	September 24, 1992	Tautenburg Observatory	L. D. Schmadel, F. Börngen	V	4.4 km	MPC; JPL
11917	1992 UX	—	October 21, 1992	Oohira	T. Urata	V	3.7 km	MPC; JPL
11918	1992 UY	—	October 21, 1992	Oohira	T. Urata	·	3.2 km	MPC; JPL
11919	1992 UD_{2}	—	October 25, 1992	Yakiimo	Natori, A., T. Urata	·	3.3 km	MPC; JPL
11920	1992 UY_{2}	—	October 25, 1992	Uenohara	N. Kawasato	·	3.1 km	MPC; JPL
11921 Mitamasahiro	1992 UN_{3}	Mitamasahiro	October 26, 1992	Kitami	K. Endate, K. Watanabe	·	14 km	MPC; JPL
11922	1992 UT_{3}	—	October 27, 1992	Oohira	T. Urata	·	3.6 km	MPC; JPL
11923	1992 WX	—	November 17, 1992	Dynic	A. Sugie	·	2.8 km	MPC; JPL
11924 Tanakatetuo	1992 WS_{3}	Tanakatetuo	November 17, 1992	Kani	Y. Mizuno, T. Furuta	·	3.7 km	MPC; JPL
11925 Usubae	1992 YA_{1}	Usubae	December 23, 1992	Geisei	T. Seki	·	2.1 km	MPC; JPL
11926 Orinoco	1992 YM_{2}	Orinoco	December 18, 1992	Caussols	E. W. Elst	·	4.6 km	MPC; JPL
11927 Mount Kent	1993 BA	Mount Kent	January 16, 1993	Geisei	T. Seki	·	8.2 km	MPC; JPL
11928 Akimotohiro	1993 BT_{2}	Akimotohiro	January 23, 1993	Kitami	K. Endate, K. Watanabe	·	8.0 km	MPC; JPL
11929 Uchino	1993 BG_{3}	Uchino	January 23, 1993	Kitami	K. Endate, K. Watanabe	·	9.6 km	MPC; JPL
11930 Osamu	1993 CJ_{1}	Osamu	February 15, 1993	Okutama	Hioki, T., Hayakawa, S.	EUN	4.3 km	MPC; JPL
11931	1993 DD_{2}	—	February 22, 1993	Oohira	T. Urata	MAR	6.6 km	MPC; JPL
11932	1993 EP	—	March 13, 1993	Fujieda	Shiozawa, H., T. Urata	EUN	6.8 km	MPC; JPL
11933 Himuka	1993 ES	Himuka	March 15, 1993	Kitami	K. Endate, K. Watanabe	·	9.2 km	MPC; JPL
11934 Lundgren	1993 FL_{4}	Lundgren	March 17, 1993	La Silla	UESAC	moon	5.2 km	MPC; JPL
11935 Olakarlsson	1993 FB_{8}	Olakarlsson	March 17, 1993	La Silla	UESAC	·	4.9 km	MPC; JPL
11936 Tremolizzo	1993 FX_{9}	Tremolizzo	March 17, 1993	La Silla	UESAC	·	5.3 km	MPC; JPL
11937	1993 FF_{16}	—	March 17, 1993	La Silla	UESAC	NEM	6.9 km	MPC; JPL
11938	1993 FZ_{26}	—	March 21, 1993	La Silla	UESAC	HOF	8.0 km	MPC; JPL
11939	1993 FH_{36}	—	March 19, 1993	La Silla	UESAC	KON	13 km	MPC; JPL
11940	1993 GR	—	April 15, 1993	Kushiro	S. Ueda, H. Kaneda	·	11 km	MPC; JPL
11941 Archinal	1993 KT_{1}	Archinal	May 23, 1993	Palomar	C. S. Shoemaker, D. H. Levy	H	4.8 km	MPC; JPL
11942 Guettard	1993 NV	Guettard	July 12, 1993	La Silla	E. W. Elst	·	4.3 km	MPC; JPL
11943 Davidhartley	1993 OF_{9}	Davidhartley	July 20, 1993	La Silla	E. W. Elst	EOS	10 km	MPC; JPL
11944 Shaftesbury	1993 OK_{9}	Shaftesbury	July 20, 1993	La Silla	E. W. Elst	KOR	6.9 km	MPC; JPL
11945 Amsterdam	1993 PC_{5}	Amsterdam	August 15, 1993	Caussols	E. W. Elst	EOS	8.0 km	MPC; JPL
11946 Bayle	1993 PB_{7}	Bayle	August 15, 1993	Caussols	E. W. Elst	THM	14 km	MPC; JPL
11947 Kimclijsters	1993 PK_{7}	Kimclijsters	August 15, 1993	Caussols	E. W. Elst	THM	8.7 km	MPC; JPL
11948 Justinehénin	1993 QQ_{4}	Justinehénin	August 18, 1993	Caussols	E. W. Elst	THM	10 km	MPC; JPL
11949 Kagayayutaka	1993 SD_{2}	Kagayayutaka	September 19, 1993	Kitami	K. Endate, K. Watanabe	·	6.9 km	MPC; JPL
11950 Morellet	1993 SG_{5}	Morellet	September 19, 1993	Caussols	E. W. Elst	THM	11 km	MPC; JPL
11951 Marcoschioppa	1994 AJ_{3}	Marcoschioppa	January 12, 1994	Farra d'Isonzo	Farra d'Isonzo	3:2	15 km	MPC; JPL
11952	1994 AM_{3}	—	January 8, 1994	Fujieda	Shiozawa, H., T. Urata	·	4.2 km	MPC; JPL
11953	1994 BW	—	January 19, 1994	Ōizumi	T. Kobayashi	V	2.0 km	MPC; JPL
11954	1994 BY	—	January 22, 1994	Fujieda	Shiozawa, H., T. Urata	·	3.2 km	MPC; JPL
11955 Russrobb	1994 CA_{1}	Russrobb	February 8, 1994	NRC-DAO	D. D. Balam	·	3.3 km	MPC; JPL
11956 Tamarakate	1994 CL_{14}	Tamarakate	February 8, 1994	La Silla	E. W. Elst	·	3.4 km	MPC; JPL
11957	1994 DS	—	February 17, 1994	Ōizumi	T. Kobayashi	·	3.6 km	MPC; JPL
11958 Galiani	1994 EJ_{7}	Galiani	March 9, 1994	Caussols	E. W. Elst	·	4.3 km	MPC; JPL
11959 Okunokeno	1994 GG_{1}	Okunokeno	April 13, 1994	Kitami	K. Endate, K. Watanabe	·	6.7 km	MPC; JPL
11960	1994 HA	—	April 17, 1994	Ōizumi	T. Kobayashi	·	4.2 km	MPC; JPL
11961	1994 PO	—	August 3, 1994	Nachi-Katsuura	Y. Shimizu, T. Urata	EUN	7.2 km	MPC; JPL
11962	1994 PX	—	August 14, 1994	Ōizumi	T. Kobayashi	·	7.8 km	MPC; JPL
11963 Ignace	1994 PO_{16}	Ignace	August 10, 1994	La Silla	E. W. Elst	·	8.3 km	MPC; JPL
11964 Prigogine	1994 PY_{17}	Prigogine	August 10, 1994	La Silla	E. W. Elst	·	5.8 km	MPC; JPL
11965 Catullus	1994 PF_{20}	Catullus	August 12, 1994	La Silla	E. W. Elst	·	7.0 km	MPC; JPL
11966 Plateau	1994 PJ_{20}	Plateau	August 12, 1994	La Silla	E. W. Elst	KOR	5.2 km	MPC; JPL
11967 Boyle	1994 PW_{20}	Boyle	August 12, 1994	La Silla	E. W. Elst	·	4.8 km	MPC; JPL
11968 Demariotte	1994 PR_{27}	Demariotte	August 12, 1994	La Silla	E. W. Elst	NEM	9.1 km	MPC; JPL
11969 Gay-Lussac	1994 PC_{37}	Gay-Lussac	August 10, 1994	La Silla	E. W. Elst	AGN	4.3 km	MPC; JPL
11970 Palitzsch	1994 TD	Palitzsch	October 4, 1994	Sormano	P. Sicoli, Ghezzi, P.	·	9.4 km	MPC; JPL
11971	1994 UJ_{2}	—	October 31, 1994	Kushiro	S. Ueda, H. Kaneda	·	11 km	MPC; JPL
11972	1994 VK	—	November 1, 1994	Ōizumi	T. Kobayashi	HYG	8.6 km	MPC; JPL
11973	1994 VN	—	November 1, 1994	Ōizumi	T. Kobayashi	·	8.1 km	MPC; JPL
11974 Yasuhidefujita	1994 YF	Yasuhidefujita	December 24, 1994	Ōizumi	T. Kobayashi	THM	10 km	MPC; JPL
11975	1995 FA_{1}	—	March 31, 1995	La Silla	Mottola, S., Koldewey, E.	·	2.4 km	MPC; JPL
11976 Josephthurn	1995 JG	Josephthurn	May 5, 1995	Farra d'Isonzo	Farra d'Isonzo	H	8.4 km	MPC; JPL
11977 Leonrisoldi	1995 OA	Leonrisoldi	July 19, 1995	Stroncone	Santa Lucia	V	6.6 km	MPC; JPL
11978 Makotomasako	1995 SS_{4}	Makotomasako	September 20, 1995	Kitami	K. Endate, K. Watanabe	·	8.7 km	MPC; JPL
11979	1995 SS_{5}	—	September 25, 1995	Xinglong	SCAP	·	2.4 km	MPC; JPL
11980 Ellis	1995 SP_{8}	Ellis	September 17, 1995	Kitt Peak	Spacewatch	V	2.4 km	MPC; JPL
11981 Boncompagni	1995 UY_{1}	Boncompagni	October 20, 1995	Bologna	San Vittore	slow	4.8 km	MPC; JPL
11982	1995 UF_{6}	—	October 25, 1995	Nachi-Katsuura	Y. Shimizu, T. Urata	EUN	4.7 km	MPC; JPL
11983	1995 UH_{6}	—	October 27, 1995	Ōizumi	T. Kobayashi	WIT ·	4.4 km	MPC; JPL
11984 Manet	1995 UK_{45}	Manet	October 20, 1995	Caussols	E. W. Elst	·	5.7 km	MPC; JPL
11985	1995 VG	—	November 1, 1995	Ōizumi	T. Kobayashi	·	7.6 km	MPC; JPL
11986	1995 VP	—	November 3, 1995	Ōizumi	T. Kobayashi	·	7.2 km	MPC; JPL
11987 Yonematsu	1995 VU_{1}	Yonematsu	November 15, 1995	Kitami	K. Endate, K. Watanabe	·	14 km	MPC; JPL
11988	1995 WB	—	November 16, 1995	Ōizumi	T. Kobayashi	·	4.8 km	MPC; JPL
11989	1995 WN_{5}	—	November 24, 1995	Ōizumi	T. Kobayashi	PAD	12 km	MPC; JPL
11990	1995 WM_{6}	—	November 21, 1995	Kushiro	S. Ueda, H. Kaneda	LEO	10 km	MPC; JPL
11991	1995 WK_{7}	—	November 27, 1995	Ōizumi	T. Kobayashi	PAD	8.4 km	MPC; JPL
11992	1995 XH	—	December 2, 1995	Ōizumi	T. Kobayashi	AGN	4.5 km	MPC; JPL
11993	1995 XX	—	December 8, 1995	Haleakalā	AMOS	EOS	8.2 km	MPC; JPL
11994	1995 YP	—	December 19, 1995	Ōizumi	T. Kobayashi	KOR	5.9 km	MPC; JPL
11995	1995 YB_{1}	—	December 21, 1995	Ōizumi	T. Kobayashi	HYG	13 km	MPC; JPL
11996	1995 YC_{1}	—	December 21, 1995	Ōizumi	T. Kobayashi	·	6.0 km	MPC; JPL
11997 Fassel	1995 YU_{9}	Fassel	December 18, 1995	Kitt Peak	Spacewatch	·	6.5 km	MPC; JPL
11998 Fermilab	1996 AG_{7}	Fermilab	January 12, 1996	Kitt Peak	Spacewatch	·	7.7 km	MPC; JPL
11999	1996 BV_{1}	—	January 23, 1996	Ōizumi	T. Kobayashi	·	6.3 km	MPC; JPL
12000	1996 CK_{2}	—	February 12, 1996	Kushiro	S. Ueda, H. Kaneda	·	10 km	MPC; JPL

back to top

== See also ==
- Meanings of minor-planet names: 11001–12000
