= Nachi-Katsuura Observatory =

- Observatory code: 905
- Location: Nachikatsuura, Wakayama
- Coordinates: 33°36′36″N 135°55′29″E
- Established: 1992
- Related media on Commons

Nachi-Katsuura's location

Nachi-Katsuura Observatory is an astronomical observatory in Nachikatsuura, Wakayama, Japan. Facing the Pacific Ocean, it lies within the Yoshino-Kumano National Park. It is 0.83368 Earth radi from the rotational axis of the Earth, and +0.55040 Earth radii above the equatorial plane. The IAU observatory code for Nachi-Katsuura is 905.

== See also ==
- List of astronomical observatories
