= List of minor planets: 427001–428000 =

The following is a partial list of minor planets, running from minor-planet number 427001 through 428000, inclusive. The primary data for this and other partial lists is based on JPL's "Small-Body Orbital Elements" and data available from the Minor Planet Center. Critical list information is also provided by the MPC, unless otherwise specified from Lowell Observatory. A detailed description of the table's columns and additional sources are given on the main page including a complete list of every page in this series, and a statistical break-up on the dynamical classification of minor planets.

Also see the summary list of all named bodies in numerical and alphabetical order, and the corresponding naming citations for the number range of this particular list. New namings may only be added to this list after official publication, as the preannouncement of names is condemned by the Working Group for Small Bodies Nomenclature of the International Astronomical Union.

Near-Earth obj.	MBA (inner)	MBA (outer)	Centaur
Mars-crosser	MBA (middle)	Jupiter trojan	Trans-Neptunian obj.
Unclassified

== 427001–427100 ==
Designation			Discovery			Properties		Ref
Permanent	Provisional	Named after	Date	Site	Discoverer(s)	Category	Diam.	Ref
427001	2014 QA_{387}	—	April 25, 2007	Kitt Peak	Spacewatch	·	2.7 km	MPC · JPL
427002	2014 QA_{409}	—	November 12, 2006	Mount Lemmon	Mount Lemmon Survey	·	1.4 km	MPC · JPL
427003	2014 QF_{409}	—	July 29, 2008	Mount Lemmon	Mount Lemmon Survey	·	2.9 km	MPC · JPL
427004	2014 QM_{432}	—	November 17, 2006	Mount Lemmon	Mount Lemmon Survey	·	1.2 km	MPC · JPL
427005	2014 QP_{438}	—	December 4, 2007	Catalina	CSS	·	770 m	MPC · JPL
427006	2014 RV_{6}	—	September 4, 2010	Kitt Peak	Spacewatch	·	1.6 km	MPC · JPL
427007	2014 RP_{18}	—	June 8, 2005	Siding Spring	SSS	·	1.9 km	MPC · JPL
427008	2014 SJ_{165}	—	June 20, 2010	Mount Lemmon	Mount Lemmon Survey	MAS	820 m	MPC · JPL
427009	2014 SZ_{206}	—	April 6, 2008	Kitt Peak	Spacewatch	·	1.3 km	MPC · JPL
427010	2014 SH_{207}	—	December 3, 2010	Mount Lemmon	Mount Lemmon Survey	·	1.2 km	MPC · JPL
427011	2014 SN_{207}	—	December 18, 2007	Mount Lemmon	Mount Lemmon Survey	·	1.3 km	MPC · JPL
427012	2014 SN_{208}	—	October 29, 2003	Kitt Peak	Spacewatch	·	3.1 km	MPC · JPL
427013	2014 SR_{209}	—	January 16, 2005	Kitt Peak	Spacewatch	EMA	3.7 km	MPC · JPL
427014	2014 SG_{210}	—	December 14, 2001	Kitt Peak	Spacewatch	·	1.5 km	MPC · JPL
427015	2014 SY_{212}	—	May 24, 2006	Kitt Peak	Spacewatch	·	2.8 km	MPC · JPL
427016	2014 SO_{214}	—	October 1, 2005	Catalina	CSS	·	1.9 km	MPC · JPL
427017	2014 SB_{215}	—	July 14, 2009	Kitt Peak	Spacewatch	·	1.6 km	MPC · JPL
427018	2014 SR_{215}	—	October 20, 2003	Socorro	LINEAR	·	3.4 km	MPC · JPL
427019	2014 SM_{216}	—	December 9, 2010	Catalina	CSS	MAR	1.6 km	MPC · JPL
427020	2014 ST_{218}	—	January 15, 2005	Kitt Peak	Spacewatch	·	2.6 km	MPC · JPL
427021	2014 SA_{219}	—	November 23, 2003	Kitt Peak	Spacewatch	PHO	1.1 km	MPC · JPL
427022	2014 SF_{219}	—	March 1, 2008	Mount Lemmon	Mount Lemmon Survey	V	740 m	MPC · JPL
427023	2014 SP_{219}	—	September 10, 2008	Siding Spring	SSS	T_{j} (2.95)	2.7 km	MPC · JPL
427024	2014 SZ_{229}	—	March 27, 2008	Mount Lemmon	Mount Lemmon Survey	·	1.6 km	MPC · JPL
427025	2014 SN_{258}	—	November 30, 2005	Kitt Peak	Spacewatch	·	2.1 km	MPC · JPL
427026	2014 SJ_{265}	—	August 28, 2005	Anderson Mesa	LONEOS	·	1.6 km	MPC · JPL
427027	2014 SW_{285}	—	September 16, 2003	Kitt Peak	Spacewatch	·	2.8 km	MPC · JPL
427028	2014 SZ_{306}	—	October 22, 2003	Kitt Peak	Spacewatch	EOS	1.9 km	MPC · JPL
427029	2014 SS_{308}	—	November 15, 2003	Kitt Peak	Spacewatch	NYS	1 km	MPC · JPL
427030	2014 SL_{309}	—	September 23, 2008	Kitt Peak	Spacewatch	·	2.9 km	MPC · JPL
427031	2014 SV_{309}	—	April 14, 2008	Mount Lemmon	Mount Lemmon Survey	·	1.7 km	MPC · JPL
427032	2014 SN_{312}	—	January 30, 2011	Mount Lemmon	Mount Lemmon Survey	·	3.6 km	MPC · JPL
427033	2014 SV_{323}	—	September 29, 2008	Mount Lemmon	Mount Lemmon Survey	·	1.9 km	MPC · JPL
427034	2014 SS_{325}	—	April 20, 2007	Kitt Peak	Spacewatch	·	2.9 km	MPC · JPL
427035	2014 SC_{328}	—	September 24, 2000	Socorro	LINEAR	·	2.1 km	MPC · JPL
427036	2014 SM_{336}	—	December 15, 2006	Kitt Peak	Spacewatch	·	1.1 km	MPC · JPL
427037	2014 TG_{5}	—	November 24, 2003	Kitt Peak	Spacewatch	MAS	860 m	MPC · JPL
427038	2014 TH_{5}	—	September 30, 2005	Kitt Peak	Spacewatch	NEM	2.1 km	MPC · JPL
427039	2014 TH_{6}	—	October 27, 2005	Mount Lemmon	Mount Lemmon Survey	HOF	2.7 km	MPC · JPL
427040	2014 TZ_{29}	—	October 7, 2004	Anderson Mesa	LONEOS	·	780 m	MPC · JPL
427041	2014 TH_{30}	—	September 10, 2007	Catalina	CSS	·	690 m	MPC · JPL
427042	2014 TN_{31}	—	March 9, 2005	Catalina	CSS	EOS	2.8 km	MPC · JPL
427043	2014 TE_{37}	—	December 16, 1993	Kitt Peak	Spacewatch	·	1.5 km	MPC · JPL
427044	2014 TK_{44}	—	September 14, 2005	Kitt Peak	Spacewatch	(7744)	1.4 km	MPC · JPL
427045	2014 TX_{55}	—	March 25, 2006	Kitt Peak	Spacewatch	EOS	2.0 km	MPC · JPL
427046	2014 TG_{56}	—	October 25, 2005	Kitt Peak	Spacewatch	·	1.8 km	MPC · JPL
427047	2014 TP_{56}	—	May 3, 2008	Mount Lemmon	Mount Lemmon Survey	·	2.3 km	MPC · JPL
427048	2014 TC_{58}	—	January 13, 2000	Kitt Peak	Spacewatch	·	3.6 km	MPC · JPL
427049	2014 TB_{59}	—	October 29, 2005	Catalina	CSS	·	2.3 km	MPC · JPL
427050	2014 TV_{65}	—	January 15, 1999	Kitt Peak	Spacewatch	·	1.4 km	MPC · JPL
427051	2014 TF_{67}	—	August 24, 2001	Anderson Mesa	LONEOS	·	1.3 km	MPC · JPL
427052	2014 TE_{69}	—	November 5, 2005	Kitt Peak	Spacewatch	WIT	880 m	MPC · JPL
427053	2014 TM_{69}	—	November 24, 2000	Kitt Peak	Spacewatch	AGN	1.0 km	MPC · JPL
427054	2014 TT_{70}	—	January 10, 2011	Mount Lemmon	Mount Lemmon Survey	HOF	2.8 km	MPC · JPL
427055	2014 TQ_{72}	—	September 27, 2009	Mount Lemmon	Mount Lemmon Survey	·	2.1 km	MPC · JPL
427056	2014 TW_{73}	—	December 19, 2004	Mount Lemmon	Mount Lemmon Survey	·	770 m	MPC · JPL
427057	2014 TN_{82}	—	December 2, 2005	Kitt Peak	Spacewatch	(18466)	2.5 km	MPC · JPL
427058	2014 TX_{83}	—	November 11, 2010	Kitt Peak	Spacewatch	EUN	1.5 km	MPC · JPL
427059	2014 TD_{84}	—	November 17, 2007	Kitt Peak	Spacewatch	PHO	1.3 km	MPC · JPL
427060	2014 TE_{84}	—	February 11, 2008	Kitt Peak	Spacewatch	(6769)	960 m	MPC · JPL
427061	2014 UD	—	December 20, 2009	Kitt Peak	Spacewatch	·	3.3 km	MPC · JPL
427062	2014 UD_{4}	—	March 29, 2008	Kitt Peak	Spacewatch	·	1.4 km	MPC · JPL
427063	2014 UK_{7}	—	November 10, 2009	Kitt Peak	Spacewatch	·	3.0 km	MPC · JPL
427064	2014 UL_{9}	—	November 8, 2010	Kitt Peak	Spacewatch	·	1.6 km	MPC · JPL
427065	2014 UF_{10}	—	January 29, 2011	Mount Lemmon	Mount Lemmon Survey	HOF	2.3 km	MPC · JPL
427066	2014 UW_{14}	—	November 19, 2001	Socorro	LINEAR	·	1.7 km	MPC · JPL
427067	2014 UF_{15}	—	November 28, 2006	Mount Lemmon	Mount Lemmon Survey	(7744)	1.6 km	MPC · JPL
427068	2014 UK_{15}	—	September 28, 2009	Mount Lemmon	Mount Lemmon Survey	·	2.1 km	MPC · JPL
427069	2014 UU_{18}	—	January 17, 2005	Kitt Peak	Spacewatch	·	2.3 km	MPC · JPL
427070	2014 UM_{19}	—	October 1, 2005	Kitt Peak	Spacewatch	·	1.7 km	MPC · JPL
427071	2014 UX_{20}	—	September 13, 2007	Kitt Peak	Spacewatch	·	650 m	MPC · JPL
427072	2014 UF_{22}	—	November 24, 2003	Kitt Peak	Spacewatch	·	3.4 km	MPC · JPL
427073	2014 UM_{22}	—	April 8, 2008	Kitt Peak	Spacewatch	·	1.5 km	MPC · JPL
427074	2014 UV_{22}	—	December 1, 2003	Kitt Peak	Spacewatch	·	1.4 km	MPC · JPL
427075	2014 UR_{23}	—	November 3, 2005	Catalina	CSS	·	2.0 km	MPC · JPL
427076	2014 UJ_{24}	—	September 24, 2008	Kitt Peak	Spacewatch	·	3.1 km	MPC · JPL
427077	2014 UQ_{24}	—	October 8, 2008	Catalina	CSS	·	3.7 km	MPC · JPL
427078	2014 UE_{25}	—	April 11, 2003	Kitt Peak	Spacewatch	·	3.0 km	MPC · JPL
427079	2014 UO_{30}	—	December 6, 2010	Mount Lemmon	Mount Lemmon Survey	·	1.9 km	MPC · JPL
427080	2014 UX_{32}	—	November 20, 2009	Kitt Peak	Spacewatch	·	1.7 km	MPC · JPL
427081	2014 UO_{40}	—	January 31, 2006	Kitt Peak	Spacewatch	·	1.7 km	MPC · JPL
427082	2014 UJ_{41}	—	November 2, 2005	Mount Lemmon	Mount Lemmon Survey	·	1.8 km	MPC · JPL
427083	2014 UG_{42}	—	September 30, 2005	Mount Lemmon	Mount Lemmon Survey	·	2.7 km	MPC · JPL
427084	2014 UE_{43}	—	November 27, 2006	Mount Lemmon	Mount Lemmon Survey	·	1.9 km	MPC · JPL
427085	2014 UN_{43}	—	November 3, 2005	Kitt Peak	Spacewatch	·	2.2 km	MPC · JPL
427086	2014 UA_{44}	—	September 27, 2000	Kitt Peak	Spacewatch	GEF	1.3 km	MPC · JPL
427087	2014 UJ_{44}	—	November 19, 2003	Kitt Peak	Spacewatch	·	3.8 km	MPC · JPL
427088	2014 UL_{45}	—	September 29, 2005	Anderson Mesa	LONEOS	·	1.6 km	MPC · JPL
427089	2014 UR_{45}	—	October 14, 2010	Mount Lemmon	Mount Lemmon Survey	(5)	1.1 km	MPC · JPL
427090	2014 US_{45}	—	September 24, 2008	Mount Lemmon	Mount Lemmon Survey	THM	2.3 km	MPC · JPL
427091	2014 UL_{46}	—	October 18, 1992	Kitt Peak	Spacewatch	·	2.5 km	MPC · JPL
427092	2014 UM_{46}	—	August 22, 2004	Kitt Peak	Spacewatch	·	2.5 km	MPC · JPL
427093	2014 UN_{46}	—	September 17, 2003	Kitt Peak	Spacewatch	NYS	940 m	MPC · JPL
427094	2014 UY_{46}	—	March 3, 2000	Kitt Peak	Spacewatch	·	3.0 km	MPC · JPL
427095	2014 UM_{53}	—	October 26, 2003	Kitt Peak	Spacewatch	·	3.6 km	MPC · JPL
427096	2014 UQ_{53}	—	September 16, 2003	Kitt Peak	Spacewatch	·	2.2 km	MPC · JPL
427097	2014 UU_{53}	—	September 16, 2003	Kitt Peak	Spacewatch	·	1.1 km	MPC · JPL
427098	2014 UW_{53}	—	November 19, 2003	Kitt Peak	Spacewatch	NYS	1.1 km	MPC · JPL
427099	2014 UD_{56}	—	September 21, 2008	Mount Lemmon	Mount Lemmon Survey	·	1.9 km	MPC · JPL
427100	2014 UF_{62}	—	November 19, 1995	Kitt Peak	Spacewatch	HOF	2.6 km	MPC · JPL

== 427101–427200 ==
back to top

Designation			Discovery			Properties		Ref
Permanent	Provisional	Named after	Date	Site	Discoverer(s)	Category	Diam.	Ref
427101	2014 UK_{62}	—	December 7, 2005	Kitt Peak	Spacewatch	MRX	1.1 km	MPC · JPL
427102	2014 UF_{64}	—	May 2, 2000	Kitt Peak	Spacewatch	MAR	1.0 km	MPC · JPL
427103	2014 UA_{67}	—	September 30, 2009	Mount Lemmon	Mount Lemmon Survey	·	1.9 km	MPC · JPL
427104	2014 UO_{67}	—	December 8, 2010	Kitt Peak	Spacewatch	·	2.0 km	MPC · JPL
427105	2014 UT_{67}	—	January 20, 2002	Kitt Peak	Spacewatch	AST	1.8 km	MPC · JPL
427106	2014 UW_{67}	—	May 13, 2008	Mount Lemmon	Mount Lemmon Survey	·	2.0 km	MPC · JPL
427107	2014 UB_{80}	—	October 19, 1999	Kitt Peak	Spacewatch	·	2.3 km	MPC · JPL
427108	2014 UC_{83}	—	February 25, 2012	Catalina	CSS	·	1.0 km	MPC · JPL
427109	2014 UU_{84}	—	September 26, 2005	Kitt Peak	Spacewatch	·	2.0 km	MPC · JPL
427110	2014 UB_{86}	—	April 2, 2005	Mount Lemmon	Mount Lemmon Survey	·	1.3 km	MPC · JPL
427111	2014 UU_{88}	—	December 10, 2009	Mount Lemmon	Mount Lemmon Survey	·	2.8 km	MPC · JPL
427112	2014 UV_{89}	—	March 18, 2007	Kitt Peak	Spacewatch	EOS	1.9 km	MPC · JPL
427113	2014 UD_{92}	—	March 23, 2004	Kitt Peak	Spacewatch	·	1.5 km	MPC · JPL
427114	2014 UE_{92}	—	December 27, 1997	Kitt Peak	Spacewatch	·	1.4 km	MPC · JPL
427115	2014 UH_{94}	—	August 19, 2010	XuYi	PMO NEO Survey Program	NYS	980 m	MPC · JPL
427116	2014 UO_{94}	—	September 20, 2001	Socorro	LINEAR	·	680 m	MPC · JPL
427117	2014 UX_{94}	—	March 1, 2009	Mount Lemmon	Mount Lemmon Survey	·	750 m	MPC · JPL
427118	2014 UM_{95}	—	March 5, 2006	Mount Lemmon	Mount Lemmon Survey	·	1.6 km	MPC · JPL
427119	2014 UO_{95}	—	October 19, 2003	Kitt Peak	Spacewatch	THM	1.8 km	MPC · JPL
427120	2014 UA_{96}	—	October 22, 2003	Kitt Peak	Spacewatch	THM	2.0 km	MPC · JPL
427121	2014 UD_{97}	—	October 22, 2009	Mount Lemmon	Mount Lemmon Survey	·	1.6 km	MPC · JPL
427122	2014 UA_{98}	—	January 4, 2011	Mount Lemmon	Mount Lemmon Survey	·	2.4 km	MPC · JPL
427123	2014 UK_{99}	—	September 24, 2005	Kitt Peak	Spacewatch	·	1.6 km	MPC · JPL
427124	2014 UN_{99}	—	November 19, 2003	Kitt Peak	Spacewatch	THM	2.8 km	MPC · JPL
427125	2014 UL_{100}	—	March 15, 2004	Kitt Peak	Spacewatch	·	1.2 km	MPC · JPL
427126	2014 UR_{100}	—	September 11, 2010	Kitt Peak	Spacewatch	NYS	1.1 km	MPC · JPL
427127	2014 UY_{100}	—	December 14, 2001	Socorro	LINEAR	·	2.0 km	MPC · JPL
427128	2014 UC_{101}	—	October 27, 1995	Kitt Peak	Spacewatch	AGN	1.2 km	MPC · JPL
427129	2014 UK_{101}	—	January 31, 2009	Mount Lemmon	Mount Lemmon Survey	·	530 m	MPC · JPL
427130	2014 UY_{102}	—	July 3, 2005	Mount Lemmon	Mount Lemmon Survey	3:2	4.6 km	MPC · JPL
427131	2014 UN_{105}	—	September 18, 2010	Mount Lemmon	Mount Lemmon Survey	·	1.1 km	MPC · JPL
427132	2014 UA_{106}	—	December 6, 2007	Mount Lemmon	Mount Lemmon Survey	·	950 m	MPC · JPL
427133	2014 UW_{113}	—	August 18, 2009	Kitt Peak	Spacewatch	·	1.4 km	MPC · JPL
427134	2014 UB_{114}	—	December 30, 2007	Kitt Peak	Spacewatch	·	1.5 km	MPC · JPL
427135	2014 UV_{117}	—	January 8, 2011	Mount Lemmon	Mount Lemmon Survey	·	2.2 km	MPC · JPL
427136	2014 UC_{127}	—	October 2, 2003	Kitt Peak	Spacewatch	EOS	1.6 km	MPC · JPL
427137	2014 UW_{132}	—	September 22, 2008	Mount Lemmon	Mount Lemmon Survey	·	4.5 km	MPC · JPL
427138	2014 UG_{135}	—	March 28, 2009	Kitt Peak	Spacewatch	·	1.3 km	MPC · JPL
427139	2014 UK_{135}	—	September 13, 2007	Mount Lemmon	Mount Lemmon Survey	·	490 m	MPC · JPL
427140	2014 UR_{135}	—	December 30, 2007	Kitt Peak	Spacewatch	·	1.0 km	MPC · JPL
427141	2014 UW_{135}	—	October 5, 2003	Kitt Peak	Spacewatch	EOS	2.0 km	MPC · JPL
427142	2014 UB_{139}	—	November 20, 2009	Kitt Peak	Spacewatch	EOS	1.6 km	MPC · JPL
427143	2014 UL_{140}	—	May 16, 2005	Mount Lemmon	Mount Lemmon Survey	·	1.3 km	MPC · JPL
427144	2014 UD_{148}	—	October 7, 2004	Kitt Peak	Spacewatch	·	2.3 km	MPC · JPL
427145	2014 UM_{148}	—	September 24, 1995	Kitt Peak	Spacewatch	MAS	490 m	MPC · JPL
427146	2014 UQ_{155}	—	March 30, 2010	WISE	WISE	·	2.9 km	MPC · JPL
427147	2014 UL_{156}	—	January 30, 2006	Kitt Peak	Spacewatch	·	610 m	MPC · JPL
427148	2014 UY_{157}	—	October 20, 2007	Mount Lemmon	Mount Lemmon Survey	·	1.1 km	MPC · JPL
427149	2014 UA_{171}	—	April 22, 2007	Kitt Peak	Spacewatch	·	1.7 km	MPC · JPL
427150	2014 UC_{171}	—	October 29, 2003	Kitt Peak	Spacewatch	·	3.1 km	MPC · JPL
427151	2014 UF_{175}	—	October 22, 2003	Anderson Mesa	LONEOS	H	820 m	MPC · JPL
427152	2014 UN_{175}	—	August 8, 2005	Siding Spring	SSS	slow	2.1 km	MPC · JPL
427153	2014 UU_{175}	—	February 1, 1995	Kitt Peak	Spacewatch	·	2.6 km	MPC · JPL
427154	2014 UJ_{178}	—	March 14, 2007	Kitt Peak	Spacewatch	·	1.9 km	MPC · JPL
427155	2014 UZ_{181}	—	September 27, 2009	Kitt Peak	Spacewatch	·	2.1 km	MPC · JPL
427156	2014 UF_{183}	—	September 20, 2001	Socorro	LINEAR	·	1.6 km	MPC · JPL
427157	2014 UQ_{183}	—	November 19, 2003	Kitt Peak	Spacewatch	·	3.2 km	MPC · JPL
427158	2014 UA_{185}	—	January 7, 2006	Mount Lemmon	Mount Lemmon Survey	·	2.4 km	MPC · JPL
427159	2014 UA_{186}	—	October 24, 2005	Kitt Peak	Spacewatch	·	2.5 km	MPC · JPL
427160	2014 UP_{186}	—	September 16, 2009	Kitt Peak	Spacewatch	·	1.8 km	MPC · JPL
427161	2014 UY_{186}	—	August 10, 2007	Kitt Peak	Spacewatch	·	540 m	MPC · JPL
427162	2014 UC_{187}	—	September 30, 2005	Mount Lemmon	Mount Lemmon Survey	·	1.8 km	MPC · JPL
427163	2014 UQ_{189}	—	January 25, 2009	Kitt Peak	Spacewatch	·	740 m	MPC · JPL
427164	2014 UT_{190}	—	December 15, 2001	Socorro	LINEAR	·	2.0 km	MPC · JPL
427165	2014 UX_{191}	—	January 27, 2007	Catalina	CSS	·	2.3 km	MPC · JPL
427166	2014 UH_{193}	—	September 18, 2010	Mount Lemmon	Mount Lemmon Survey	·	1.1 km	MPC · JPL
427167	2014 UC_{197}	—	July 8, 2010	WISE	WISE	·	1.9 km	MPC · JPL
427168	2014 UH_{197}	—	October 1, 2008	Mount Lemmon	Mount Lemmon Survey	·	2.4 km	MPC · JPL
427169	2014 UU_{197}	—	December 13, 2006	Kitt Peak	Spacewatch	·	1.2 km	MPC · JPL
427170	2014 UU_{199}	—	March 26, 2009	Kitt Peak	Spacewatch	·	1.4 km	MPC · JPL
427171	2014 UX_{199}	—	October 9, 2008	Mount Lemmon	Mount Lemmon Survey	·	4.3 km	MPC · JPL
427172	2014 UY_{205}	—	September 22, 2008	Catalina	CSS	·	4.3 km	MPC · JPL
427173	2014 UZ_{208}	—	December 26, 2009	Kitt Peak	Spacewatch	·	2.6 km	MPC · JPL
427174	2014 UY_{214}	—	November 19, 2003	Kitt Peak	Spacewatch	·	3.3 km	MPC · JPL
427175	2014 UH_{215}	—	May 27, 2008	Kitt Peak	Spacewatch	GEF	1.6 km	MPC · JPL
427176	2014 UO_{215}	—	December 1, 2003	Socorro	LINEAR	·	3.2 km	MPC · JPL
427177	2014 UX_{215}	—	March 21, 2010	WISE	WISE	·	4.1 km	MPC · JPL
427178	2014 UJ_{216}	—	December 1, 2003	Socorro	LINEAR	·	1.2 km	MPC · JPL
427179	2014 UD_{217}	—	November 1, 2006	Mount Lemmon	Mount Lemmon Survey	(5)	2.1 km	MPC · JPL
427180	2014 VK	—	January 31, 2006	Kitt Peak	Spacewatch	·	2.3 km	MPC · JPL
427181	2014 VE_{1}	—	February 11, 2002	Socorro	LINEAR	H	650 m	MPC · JPL
427182	2014 VF_{9}	—	November 9, 1999	Kitt Peak	Spacewatch	MAS	450 m	MPC · JPL
427183	2014 VX_{9}	—	September 27, 2003	Kitt Peak	Spacewatch	MAS	580 m	MPC · JPL
427184	2014 VM_{10}	—	April 25, 2007	Mount Lemmon	Mount Lemmon Survey	·	3.0 km	MPC · JPL
427185	2014 VD_{11}	—	January 17, 2007	Kitt Peak	Spacewatch	·	1.4 km	MPC · JPL
427186	2014 VA_{12}	—	August 16, 2009	Catalina	CSS	DOR	2.3 km	MPC · JPL
427187	2014 VZ_{12}	—	May 19, 2005	Mount Lemmon	Mount Lemmon Survey	·	1.3 km	MPC · JPL
427188	2014 VB_{14}	—	September 17, 1998	Caussols	ODAS	·	3.1 km	MPC · JPL
427189	2014 VD_{14}	—	October 18, 2003	Anderson Mesa	LONEOS	·	2.5 km	MPC · JPL
427190	2014 VH_{14}	—	November 21, 2003	Socorro	LINEAR	T_{j} (2.96)	3.4 km	MPC · JPL
427191	2014 VR_{16}	—	January 16, 2005	Kitt Peak	Spacewatch	·	2.2 km	MPC · JPL
427192	2014 VG_{17}	—	September 12, 2007	Catalina	CSS	·	720 m	MPC · JPL
427193	2014 VN_{19}	—	September 28, 2003	Anderson Mesa	LONEOS	V	750 m	MPC · JPL
427194	2014 VW_{19}	—	December 10, 2004	Kitt Peak	Spacewatch	·	2.5 km	MPC · JPL
427195	2014 VT_{20}	—	May 9, 1996	Kitt Peak	Spacewatch	RAF	1.1 km	MPC · JPL
427196	2014 VS_{21}	—	September 29, 2005	Kitt Peak	Spacewatch	·	1.0 km	MPC · JPL
427197	2014 VA_{22}	—	October 29, 2005	Mount Lemmon	Mount Lemmon Survey	·	1.6 km	MPC · JPL
427198	2014 VE_{22}	—	December 6, 2010	Kitt Peak	Spacewatch	·	1.4 km	MPC · JPL
427199	2014 VX_{25}	—	November 21, 1997	Kitt Peak	Spacewatch	·	1.7 km	MPC · JPL
427200	2014 VG_{28}	—	October 31, 2005	Mount Lemmon	Mount Lemmon Survey	·	1.7 km	MPC · JPL

== 427201–427300 ==
back to top

Designation			Discovery			Properties		Ref
Permanent	Provisional	Named after	Date	Site	Discoverer(s)	Category	Diam.	Ref
427201	2014 VK_{28}	—	October 21, 2003	Kitt Peak	Spacewatch	MAS	600 m	MPC · JPL
427202	2014 VR_{31}	—	November 20, 2001	Socorro	LINEAR	CYB	3.7 km	MPC · JPL
427203	2014 VY_{32}	—	November 24, 2003	Kitt Peak	Spacewatch	·	3.4 km	MPC · JPL
427204	2014 VA_{35}	—	September 30, 2005	Mount Lemmon	Mount Lemmon Survey	·	2.3 km	MPC · JPL
427205	2014 VO_{36}	—	December 28, 2005	Kitt Peak	Spacewatch	·	820 m	MPC · JPL
427206	2014 VQ_{37}	—	October 23, 2003	Anderson Mesa	LONEOS	·	4.3 km	MPC · JPL
427207	2014 WM	—	February 26, 2011	Mount Lemmon	Mount Lemmon Survey	·	2.9 km	MPC · JPL
427208	2014 WN	—	May 4, 2009	Mount Lemmon	Mount Lemmon Survey	MAS	880 m	MPC · JPL
427209	2014 WJ_{2}	—	October 20, 2003	Kitt Peak	Spacewatch	·	1.1 km	MPC · JPL
427210	2014 WU_{2}	—	January 29, 1995	Kitt Peak	Spacewatch	·	3.1 km	MPC · JPL
427211	2014 WA_{3}	—	October 31, 2010	Kitt Peak	Spacewatch	EUN	910 m	MPC · JPL
427212	2014 WX_{3}	—	March 23, 2006	Kitt Peak	Spacewatch	·	770 m	MPC · JPL
427213	2014 WV_{8}	—	October 24, 2009	Kitt Peak	Spacewatch	KOR	1.3 km	MPC · JPL
427214	2014 WM_{10}	—	September 21, 2009	Mount Lemmon	Mount Lemmon Survey	·	1.6 km	MPC · JPL
427215	2014 WS_{10}	—	October 6, 2005	Mount Lemmon	Mount Lemmon Survey	·	1.8 km	MPC · JPL
427216	2014 WK_{13}	—	December 13, 2004	Kitt Peak	Spacewatch	V	550 m	MPC · JPL
427217	2014 WE_{14}	—	March 4, 1997	Kitt Peak	Spacewatch	KOR	1.5 km	MPC · JPL
427218	2014 WU_{18}	—	September 14, 2005	Kitt Peak	Spacewatch	·	1.1 km	MPC · JPL
427219	2014 WK_{22}	—	October 30, 2007	Kitt Peak	Spacewatch	·	1.1 km	MPC · JPL
427220	2014 WS_{22}	—	September 28, 2000	Kitt Peak	Spacewatch	·	1.7 km	MPC · JPL
427221	2014 WB_{31}	—	October 1, 2003	Anderson Mesa	LONEOS	EOS	2.3 km	MPC · JPL
427222	2014 WS_{33}	—	October 7, 2004	Kitt Peak	Spacewatch	·	2.0 km	MPC · JPL
427223	2014 WT_{34}	—	November 17, 2006	Kitt Peak	Spacewatch	·	1.2 km	MPC · JPL
427224	2014 WQ_{41}	—	November 18, 2003	Kitt Peak	Spacewatch	NYS	880 m	MPC · JPL
427225	2014 WP_{42}	—	September 26, 2000	Haleakala	NEAT	·	2.0 km	MPC · JPL
427226	2014 WX_{43}	—	October 22, 2005	Kitt Peak	Spacewatch	NEM	2.6 km	MPC · JPL
427227	2014 WZ_{44}	—	May 26, 2007	Mount Lemmon	Mount Lemmon Survey	DOR	2.6 km	MPC · JPL
427228	2014 WZ_{47}	—	November 10, 2009	Kitt Peak	Spacewatch	·	3.2 km	MPC · JPL
427229	2014 WP_{48}	—	October 23, 2006	Mount Lemmon	Mount Lemmon Survey	·	990 m	MPC · JPL
427230	2014 WK_{50}	—	April 29, 2008	Mount Lemmon	Mount Lemmon Survey	L5	10 km	MPC · JPL
427231	2014 WO_{54}	—	November 20, 2009	Kitt Peak	Spacewatch	·	3.7 km	MPC · JPL
427232	2014 WT_{54}	—	December 1, 2005	Kitt Peak	Spacewatch	AEO	1.3 km	MPC · JPL
427233	2014 WH_{55}	—	October 19, 2003	Kitt Peak	Spacewatch	MAS	580 m	MPC · JPL
427234	2014 WR_{55}	—	December 5, 1999	Kitt Peak	Spacewatch	·	1.2 km	MPC · JPL
427235	2014 WB_{56}	—	November 25, 2006	Mount Lemmon	Mount Lemmon Survey	·	1.3 km	MPC · JPL
427236	2014 WM_{59}	—	February 25, 2007	Mount Lemmon	Mount Lemmon Survey	·	1.8 km	MPC · JPL
427237	2014 WH_{60}	—	February 8, 2002	Kitt Peak	Spacewatch	HOF	2.9 km	MPC · JPL
427238	2014 WC_{61}	—	October 29, 2005	Mount Lemmon	Mount Lemmon Survey	GEF	1.3 km	MPC · JPL
427239	2014 WF_{61}	—	December 2, 2010	Kitt Peak	Spacewatch	·	1.5 km	MPC · JPL
427240	2014 WJ_{61}	—	November 30, 2005	Kitt Peak	Spacewatch	DOR	2.8 km	MPC · JPL
427241	2014 WZ_{61}	—	December 29, 2003	Kitt Peak	Spacewatch	·	1.4 km	MPC · JPL
427242	2014 WB_{65}	—	October 24, 2005	Kitt Peak	Spacewatch	·	1.6 km	MPC · JPL
427243	2014 WR_{66}	—	October 7, 2005	Mount Lemmon	Mount Lemmon Survey	·	1.3 km	MPC · JPL
427244	2014 WG_{67}	—	May 25, 2006	Mount Lemmon	Mount Lemmon Survey	·	4.8 km	MPC · JPL
427245	2014 WM_{67}	—	November 19, 2003	Kitt Peak	Spacewatch	·	4.0 km	MPC · JPL
427246	2014 WU_{67}	—	January 6, 2010	Kitt Peak	Spacewatch	THM	2.2 km	MPC · JPL
427247	2014 WC_{70}	—	August 9, 2007	Socorro	LINEAR	T_{j} (2.98)	4.5 km	MPC · JPL
427248	2014 WN_{70}	—	April 6, 2008	Kitt Peak	Spacewatch	·	1.4 km	MPC · JPL
427249	2014 WY_{74}	—	November 9, 2001	Socorro	LINEAR	·	1.5 km	MPC · JPL
427250	2014 WP_{76}	—	December 18, 2003	Kitt Peak	Spacewatch	NYS	910 m	MPC · JPL
427251	2014 WN_{85}	—	August 22, 2004	Kitt Peak	Spacewatch	HOF	2.4 km	MPC · JPL
427252	2014 WR_{96}	—	March 8, 2005	Mount Lemmon	Mount Lemmon Survey	·	1.2 km	MPC · JPL
427253	2014 WU_{102}	—	November 1, 1999	Kitt Peak	Spacewatch	·	1.1 km	MPC · JPL
427254	2014 WZ_{109}	—	February 1, 2006	Kitt Peak	Spacewatch	·	3.3 km	MPC · JPL
427255	2014 WT_{115}	—	April 29, 2006	Kitt Peak	Spacewatch	·	5.0 km	MPC · JPL
427256	2014 WQ_{117}	—	September 25, 2009	Catalina	CSS	·	2.2 km	MPC · JPL
427257	2014 WN_{118}	—	May 10, 2005	Kitt Peak	Spacewatch	·	3.1 km	MPC · JPL
427258	2014 WV_{128}	—	November 27, 2011	Mount Lemmon	Mount Lemmon Survey	·	810 m	MPC · JPL
427259	2014 WW_{128}	—	April 27, 2008	Mount Lemmon	Mount Lemmon Survey	·	2.1 km	MPC · JPL
427260	2014 WE_{145}	—	December 6, 1996	Kitt Peak	Spacewatch	·	2.1 km	MPC · JPL
427261	2014 WW_{147}	—	November 16, 1998	Kitt Peak	Spacewatch	·	2.3 km	MPC · JPL
427262	2014 WV_{157}	—	November 3, 2005	Kitt Peak	Spacewatch	·	2.0 km	MPC · JPL
427263	2014 WL_{159}	—	March 21, 2009	Kitt Peak	Spacewatch	·	1.4 km	MPC · JPL
427264	2014 WO_{160}	—	September 19, 2006	Catalina	CSS	·	1.3 km	MPC · JPL
427265	2014 WN_{163}	—	November 21, 2005	Kitt Peak	Spacewatch	·	2.4 km	MPC · JPL
427266	2014 WO_{163}	—	September 25, 1998	Kitt Peak	Spacewatch	·	1.7 km	MPC · JPL
427267	2014 WS_{163}	—	December 29, 2003	Socorro	LINEAR	·	2.9 km	MPC · JPL
427268	2014 WJ_{166}	—	January 13, 2008	Kitt Peak	Spacewatch	·	1.1 km	MPC · JPL
427269	2014 WO_{166}	—	November 25, 1997	Kitt Peak	Spacewatch	·	1.7 km	MPC · JPL
427270	2014 WT_{167}	—	January 4, 2012	Mount Lemmon	Mount Lemmon Survey	·	720 m	MPC · JPL
427271	2014 WQ_{168}	—	January 8, 2002	Socorro	LINEAR	·	630 m	MPC · JPL
427272	2014 WA_{170}	—	November 16, 2006	Mount Lemmon	Mount Lemmon Survey	·	1.5 km	MPC · JPL
427273	2014 WQ_{170}	—	December 22, 2003	Kitt Peak	Spacewatch	·	950 m	MPC · JPL
427274	2014 WK_{180}	—	December 16, 2004	Kitt Peak	Spacewatch	·	3.1 km	MPC · JPL
427275	2014 WG_{183}	—	December 7, 2005	Kitt Peak	Spacewatch	AGN	1.7 km	MPC · JPL
427276	2014 WY_{183}	—	April 2, 2005	Mount Lemmon	Mount Lemmon Survey	·	2.9 km	MPC · JPL
427277	2014 WF_{186}	—	September 18, 2003	Kitt Peak	Spacewatch	·	830 m	MPC · JPL
427278	2014 WV_{191}	—	January 15, 2010	Catalina	CSS	·	4.5 km	MPC · JPL
427279	2014 WZ_{196}	—	February 29, 2008	Kitt Peak	Spacewatch	·	1.7 km	MPC · JPL
427280	2014 WN_{197}	—	May 13, 1996	Kitt Peak	Spacewatch	fast	1.6 km	MPC · JPL
427281	2014 WY_{197}	—	March 11, 2008	Mount Lemmon	Mount Lemmon Survey	PHO	760 m	MPC · JPL
427282	2014 WZ_{202}	—	November 2, 2007	Catalina	CSS	PHO	1.1 km	MPC · JPL
427283	2014 WN_{208}	—	December 1, 2003	Socorro	LINEAR	·	5.3 km	MPC · JPL
427284	2014 WK_{212}	—	December 28, 2005	Kitt Peak	Spacewatch	·	2.9 km	MPC · JPL
427285	2014 WM_{219}	—	October 21, 2008	Mount Lemmon	Mount Lemmon Survey	·	3.0 km	MPC · JPL
427286	2014 WW_{230}	—	September 11, 2010	Catalina	CSS	V	560 m	MPC · JPL
427287	2014 WH_{231}	—	October 10, 2008	Mount Lemmon	Mount Lemmon Survey	·	3.1 km	MPC · JPL
427288	2014 WE_{235}	—	August 28, 1995	Kitt Peak	Spacewatch	·	4.7 km	MPC · JPL
427289	2014 WD_{238}	—	December 17, 2009	Mount Lemmon	Mount Lemmon Survey	·	3.0 km	MPC · JPL
427290	2014 WY_{238}	—	December 24, 2011	Mount Lemmon	Mount Lemmon Survey	·	730 m	MPC · JPL
427291	2014 WP_{241}	—	April 9, 2010	WISE	WISE	·	3.6 km	MPC · JPL
427292	2014 WR_{241}	—	June 9, 2007	Kitt Peak	Spacewatch	·	3.7 km	MPC · JPL
427293	2014 WF_{250}	—	October 8, 2007	Catalina	CSS	V	640 m	MPC · JPL
427294	2014 WZ_{252}	—	November 15, 2006	Mount Lemmon	Mount Lemmon Survey	·	780 m	MPC · JPL
427295	2014 WJ_{253}	—	April 25, 2007	Kitt Peak	Spacewatch	·	3.4 km	MPC · JPL
427296	2014 WL_{253}	—	December 20, 2004	Mount Lemmon	Mount Lemmon Survey	VER	4.2 km	MPC · JPL
427297	2014 WQ_{253}	—	April 11, 2008	Mount Lemmon	Mount Lemmon Survey	·	3.2 km	MPC · JPL
427298	2014 WS_{253}	—	December 10, 2004	Kitt Peak	Spacewatch	·	2.4 km	MPC · JPL
427299	2014 WZ_{258}	—	September 29, 2009	Mount Lemmon	Mount Lemmon Survey	·	1.9 km	MPC · JPL
427300	2014 WT_{259}	—	January 16, 2005	Kitt Peak	Spacewatch	·	610 m	MPC · JPL

== 427301–427400 ==
back to top

Designation			Discovery			Properties		Ref
Permanent	Provisional	Named after	Date	Site	Discoverer(s)	Category	Diam.	Ref
427301	2014 WR_{260}	—	November 17, 2006	Mount Lemmon	Mount Lemmon Survey	·	890 m	MPC · JPL
427302	2014 WZ_{260}	—	November 10, 2004	Kitt Peak	Spacewatch	·	830 m	MPC · JPL
427303	2014 WP_{264}	—	December 28, 2003	Kitt Peak	Spacewatch	·	4.0 km	MPC · JPL
427304	2014 WE_{266}	—	September 16, 2009	Catalina	CSS	·	2.6 km	MPC · JPL
427305	2014 WO_{267}	—	June 1, 2005	Kitt Peak	Spacewatch	·	1.4 km	MPC · JPL
427306	2014 WZ_{268}	—	October 1, 2010	Kitt Peak	Spacewatch	·	950 m	MPC · JPL
427307	2014 WJ_{272}	—	March 20, 2007	Kitt Peak	Spacewatch	·	2.4 km	MPC · JPL
427308	2014 WU_{278}	—	February 21, 2006	Kitt Peak	Spacewatch	·	2.6 km	MPC · JPL
427309	2014 WW_{280}	—	February 7, 2008	Mount Lemmon	Mount Lemmon Survey	·	1.8 km	MPC · JPL
427310	2014 WA_{282}	—	February 15, 2010	Catalina	CSS	·	3.0 km	MPC · JPL
427311	2014 WH_{285}	—	November 20, 2009	Mount Lemmon	Mount Lemmon Survey	·	1.8 km	MPC · JPL
427312	2014 WL_{285}	—	March 11, 1996	Kitt Peak	Spacewatch	·	780 m	MPC · JPL
427313	2014 WQ_{286}	—	April 21, 2003	Kitt Peak	Spacewatch	·	2.4 km	MPC · JPL
427314	2014 WW_{290}	—	September 9, 2007	Anderson Mesa	LONEOS	·	660 m	MPC · JPL
427315	2014 WB_{291}	—	April 30, 2004	Kitt Peak	Spacewatch	·	2.2 km	MPC · JPL
427316	2014 WT_{291}	—	February 29, 2004	Kitt Peak	Spacewatch	·	1.5 km	MPC · JPL
427317	2014 WH_{292}	—	January 26, 2010	WISE	WISE	·	3.8 km	MPC · JPL
427318	2014 WO_{292}	—	March 4, 2011	Mount Lemmon	Mount Lemmon Survey	·	1.8 km	MPC · JPL
427319	2014 WU_{292}	—	July 30, 2008	Mount Lemmon	Mount Lemmon Survey	EOS	1.6 km	MPC · JPL
427320	2014 WV_{293}	—	February 16, 2007	Catalina	CSS	·	2.4 km	MPC · JPL
427321	2014 WK_{294}	—	April 25, 2007	Mount Lemmon	Mount Lemmon Survey	BRA	1.5 km	MPC · JPL
427322	2014 WC_{295}	—	December 31, 2002	Socorro	LINEAR	MAR	1.5 km	MPC · JPL
427323	2014 WM_{295}	—	January 5, 2006	Kitt Peak	Spacewatch	·	2.2 km	MPC · JPL
427324	2014 WY_{300}	—	December 23, 2006	Mount Lemmon	Mount Lemmon Survey	·	1.8 km	MPC · JPL
427325	2014 WB_{309}	—	March 5, 2011	Catalina	CSS	·	2.5 km	MPC · JPL
427326	2014 WZ_{310}	—	September 27, 2005	Kitt Peak	Spacewatch	·	1.4 km	MPC · JPL
427327	2014 WJ_{311}	—	September 10, 2007	Kitt Peak	Spacewatch	·	730 m	MPC · JPL
427328	2014 WQ_{314}	—	November 4, 2005	Mount Lemmon	Mount Lemmon Survey	·	2.2 km	MPC · JPL
427329	2014 WQ_{316}	—	June 8, 2005	Kitt Peak	Spacewatch	T_{j} (2.94) · 3:2	5.9 km	MPC · JPL
427330	2014 WL_{317}	—	November 16, 2006	Kitt Peak	Spacewatch	MAR	1.1 km	MPC · JPL
427331	2014 WA_{324}	—	March 6, 2010	WISE	WISE	·	3.7 km	MPC · JPL
427332	2014 WF_{326}	—	August 7, 2008	Kitt Peak	Spacewatch	·	1.8 km	MPC · JPL
427333	2014 WV_{326}	—	September 19, 2008	Kitt Peak	Spacewatch	EOS	1.5 km	MPC · JPL
427334	2014 WW_{327}	—	February 2, 2006	Kitt Peak	Spacewatch	NAE	3.2 km	MPC · JPL
427335	2014 WC_{331}	—	October 22, 2003	Apache Point	SDSS	EOS	2.0 km	MPC · JPL
427336	2014 WW_{334}	—	March 5, 2006	Kitt Peak	Spacewatch	·	3.2 km	MPC · JPL
427337	2014 WR_{337}	—	November 27, 2005	Anderson Mesa	LONEOS	·	1.7 km	MPC · JPL
427338	2014 WR_{340}	—	February 1, 2006	Kitt Peak	Spacewatch	·	2.2 km	MPC · JPL
427339	2014 WV_{342}	—	July 30, 2008	Kitt Peak	Spacewatch	·	3.0 km	MPC · JPL
427340	2014 WK_{348}	—	November 17, 2007	Mount Lemmon	Mount Lemmon Survey	·	1.2 km	MPC · JPL
427341	2014 WN_{348}	—	September 21, 2003	Kitt Peak	Spacewatch	·	2.7 km	MPC · JPL
427342	2014 WQ_{349}	—	September 29, 2005	Kitt Peak	Spacewatch	·	2.0 km	MPC · JPL
427343	2014 WC_{353}	—	November 17, 2006	Mount Lemmon	Mount Lemmon Survey	·	1.4 km	MPC · JPL
427344	2014 WA_{354}	—	February 21, 2007	Mount Lemmon	Mount Lemmon Survey	·	1.6 km	MPC · JPL
427345	2014 WP_{358}	—	October 8, 1993	Kitt Peak	Spacewatch	EOS	2.0 km	MPC · JPL
427346	2014 WW_{364}	—	March 17, 2007	Catalina	CSS	L5	20 km	MPC · JPL
427347	2014 WO_{374}	—	September 21, 2003	Kitt Peak	Spacewatch	·	930 m	MPC · JPL
427348	2014 WT_{377}	—	March 12, 2005	Kitt Peak	Spacewatch	ELF	3.7 km	MPC · JPL
427349	2014 WU_{381}	—	September 19, 2001	Socorro	LINEAR	·	1.7 km	MPC · JPL
427350	2014 WE_{392}	—	March 31, 2010	WISE	WISE	·	3.1 km	MPC · JPL
427351	2014 WX_{392}	—	October 21, 2003	Kitt Peak	Spacewatch	·	2.2 km	MPC · JPL
427352	2014 WG_{393}	—	December 18, 2003	Kitt Peak	Spacewatch	·	3.6 km	MPC · JPL
427353	2014 WS_{400}	—	March 11, 2010	WISE	WISE	·	4.6 km	MPC · JPL
427354	2014 WT_{401}	—	November 30, 1999	Kitt Peak	Spacewatch	KOR	1.5 km	MPC · JPL
427355	2014 WA_{404}	—	December 1, 2003	Kitt Peak	Spacewatch	·	2.4 km	MPC · JPL
427356	2014 WQ_{406}	—	March 29, 2010	WISE	WISE	·	3.4 km	MPC · JPL
427357	2014 WX_{407}	—	December 6, 2005	Kitt Peak	Spacewatch	·	2.6 km	MPC · JPL
427358	2014 WY_{412}	—	June 14, 2010	Mount Lemmon	Mount Lemmon Survey	·	860 m	MPC · JPL
427359	2014 WZ_{413}	—	April 1, 2005	Catalina	CSS	·	5.3 km	MPC · JPL
427360	2014 WA_{427}	—	January 8, 2010	Kitt Peak	Spacewatch	EOS	1.8 km	MPC · JPL
427361	2014 WL_{427}	—	June 4, 2005	Kitt Peak	Spacewatch	·	1.5 km	MPC · JPL
427362	2014 WS_{435}	—	August 29, 2006	Catalina	CSS	PHO	930 m	MPC · JPL
427363	2014 WR_{447}	—	November 10, 2010	Mount Lemmon	Mount Lemmon Survey	·	1.9 km	MPC · JPL
427364	2014 WY_{448}	—	December 28, 2005	Kitt Peak	Spacewatch	DOR	3.3 km	MPC · JPL
427365	2014 WK_{452}	—	October 24, 2003	Kitt Peak	Spacewatch	EOS	1.9 km	MPC · JPL
427366	2014 WB_{456}	—	September 19, 2001	Socorro	LINEAR	·	3.5 km	MPC · JPL
427367	2014 WF_{461}	—	November 10, 2001	Socorro	LINEAR	ADE	1.8 km	MPC · JPL
427368	2014 WE_{465}	—	December 18, 2003	Socorro	LINEAR	·	1.6 km	MPC · JPL
427369	2014 WB_{472}	—	June 1, 1997	Kitt Peak	Spacewatch	L5	10 km	MPC · JPL
427370	2014 WD_{472}	—	December 16, 2003	Kitt Peak	Spacewatch	·	5.2 km	MPC · JPL
427371	2014 WF_{484}	—	January 4, 2003	Socorro	LINEAR	·	1.7 km	MPC · JPL
427372	2014 WB_{485}	—	October 2, 2003	Kitt Peak	Spacewatch	NYS	960 m	MPC · JPL
427373	2014 WF_{498}	—	December 19, 2001	Socorro	LINEAR	·	2.5 km	MPC · JPL
427374	2014 XO	—	January 18, 2005	Kitt Peak	Spacewatch	L5	9.4 km	MPC · JPL
427375	2014 XW_{7}	—	October 23, 2006	Kitt Peak	Spacewatch	H	480 m	MPC · JPL
427376	2014 XQ_{12}	—	August 28, 2005	Kitt Peak	Spacewatch	·	1.2 km	MPC · JPL
427377	2014 XF_{15}	—	November 17, 2006	Kitt Peak	Spacewatch	·	1.4 km	MPC · JPL
427378	2014 XN_{15}	—	November 20, 2001	Socorro	LINEAR	·	2.2 km	MPC · JPL
427379	2014 XD_{17}	—	September 9, 1977	Palomar	E. Bowell	·	1.3 km	MPC · JPL
427380	2014 XC_{26}	—	October 26, 2009	Mount Lemmon	Mount Lemmon Survey	·	1.9 km	MPC · JPL
427381	2014 XS_{26}	—	December 18, 2001	Socorro	LINEAR	MAR	1.7 km	MPC · JPL
427382	2014 XZ_{26}	—	October 26, 2009	Mount Lemmon	Mount Lemmon Survey	·	2.1 km	MPC · JPL
427383	2014 XD_{27}	—	March 12, 1996	Kitt Peak	Spacewatch	·	1.9 km	MPC · JPL
427384	2014 XX_{28}	—	June 12, 2012	Mount Lemmon	Mount Lemmon Survey	·	3.3 km	MPC · JPL
427385	2014 XC_{29}	—	November 22, 2009	Catalina	CSS	·	4.0 km	MPC · JPL
427386	2014 XK_{39}	—	October 22, 2003	Kitt Peak	Spacewatch	·	3.5 km	MPC · JPL
427387	2014 XM_{39}	—	November 28, 2005	Catalina	CSS	·	2.4 km	MPC · JPL
427388	2014 YH_{5}	—	June 13, 2005	Mount Lemmon	Mount Lemmon Survey	H	640 m	MPC · JPL
427389	2014 YA_{11}	—	November 20, 2009	Kitt Peak	Spacewatch	·	1.9 km	MPC · JPL
427390	2014 YQ_{16}	—	September 10, 2004	Kitt Peak	Spacewatch	·	2.2 km	MPC · JPL
427391	2014 YW_{16}	—	December 18, 2009	Mount Lemmon	Mount Lemmon Survey	VER	4.5 km	MPC · JPL
427392	2014 YO_{30}	—	March 12, 2010	Catalina	CSS	·	1.8 km	MPC · JPL
427393	2014 YB_{32}	—	December 19, 2003	Kitt Peak	Spacewatch	·	3.4 km	MPC · JPL
427394	1995 SJ_{76}	—	September 20, 1995	Kitt Peak	Spacewatch	·	2.6 km	MPC · JPL
427395	1995 UB_{31}	—	October 20, 1995	Kitt Peak	Spacewatch	·	1.5 km	MPC · JPL
427396	1996 TA	—	October 1, 1996	Sudbury	D. di Cicco	JUN	1.2 km	MPC · JPL
427397	1997 NZ_{1}	—	July 3, 1997	Kitt Peak	Spacewatch	·	1.3 km	MPC · JPL
427398	1997 SQ_{7}	—	September 23, 1997	Kitt Peak	Spacewatch	·	1.1 km	MPC · JPL
427399	1997 SY_{7}	—	September 23, 1997	Kitt Peak	Spacewatch	·	1.8 km	MPC · JPL
427400	1997 WH_{56}	—	October 31, 1997	Caussols	ODAS	·	630 m	MPC · JPL

== 427401–427500 ==
back to top

Designation			Discovery			Properties		Ref
Permanent	Provisional	Named after	Date	Site	Discoverer(s)	Category	Diam.	Ref
427401	1998 HJ_{5}	—	April 22, 1998	Kitt Peak	Spacewatch	·	2.1 km	MPC · JPL
427402	1998 MU_{15}	—	June 26, 1998	Kitt Peak	Spacewatch	·	4.1 km	MPC · JPL
427403	1998 RN_{8}	—	September 12, 1998	Kitt Peak	Spacewatch	BRA	1.9 km	MPC · JPL
427404	1999 CO_{135}	—	February 8, 1999	Kitt Peak	Spacewatch	·	2.3 km	MPC · JPL
427405	1999 RD_{45}	—	September 9, 1999	Socorro	LINEAR	T_{j} (2.95)	3.8 km	MPC · JPL
427406	1999 RV_{185}	—	September 9, 1999	Socorro	LINEAR	·	1.0 km	MPC · JPL
427407	1999 TR_{7}	—	October 2, 1999	Socorro	LINEAR	·	2.6 km	MPC · JPL
427408	1999 TU_{219}	—	October 1, 1999	Catalina	CSS	·	2.0 km	MPC · JPL
427409	1999 UA_{22}	—	October 20, 1999	Kitt Peak	Spacewatch	AGN	1.3 km	MPC · JPL
427410	1999 UG_{31}	—	October 31, 1999	Kitt Peak	Spacewatch	·	2.2 km	MPC · JPL
427411	1999 VF_{42}	—	November 4, 1999	Kitt Peak	Spacewatch	AGN	1.4 km	MPC · JPL
427412	1999 VQ_{156}	—	November 12, 1999	Socorro	LINEAR	·	960 m	MPC · JPL
427413	1999 XT_{53}	—	December 7, 1999	Socorro	LINEAR	·	2.3 km	MPC · JPL
427414	1999 XX_{147}	—	November 29, 1999	Kitt Peak	Spacewatch	·	1.9 km	MPC · JPL
427415	2000 AP_{221}	—	December 31, 1999	Kitt Peak	Spacewatch	MAS	660 m	MPC · JPL
427416	2000 BN_{31}	—	January 29, 2000	Kitt Peak	Spacewatch	H	550 m	MPC · JPL
427417	2000 DE_{118}	—	February 27, 2000	Kitt Peak	Spacewatch	·	1.0 km	MPC · JPL
427418	2000 KD_{49}	—	May 29, 2000	Kitt Peak	Spacewatch	·	3.5 km	MPC · JPL
427419	2000 NH_{8}	—	July 5, 2000	Kitt Peak	Spacewatch	·	1.2 km	MPC · JPL
427420	2000 QO_{34}	—	August 26, 2000	Socorro	LINEAR	H	560 m	MPC · JPL
427421	2000 QO_{133}	—	August 26, 2000	Socorro	LINEAR	(1547)	1.9 km	MPC · JPL
427422	2000 RA_{37}	—	August 31, 2000	Socorro	LINEAR	·	1.7 km	MPC · JPL
427423	2000 SO_{11}	—	September 24, 2000	Socorro	LINEAR	·	1.5 km	MPC · JPL
427424	2000 SP_{21}	—	September 24, 2000	Socorro	LINEAR	H	650 m	MPC · JPL
427425	2000 SV_{21}	—	September 24, 2000	Socorro	LINEAR	H	570 m	MPC · JPL
427426	2000 SW_{96}	—	September 23, 2000	Socorro	LINEAR	·	840 m	MPC · JPL
427427	2000 SB_{162}	—	September 20, 2000	Haleakala	NEAT	·	2.6 km	MPC · JPL
427428	2000 SK_{181}	—	September 19, 2000	Haleakala	NEAT	·	1.3 km	MPC · JPL
427429	2000 SR_{304}	—	September 30, 2000	Socorro	LINEAR	·	2.0 km	MPC · JPL
427430	2000 SM_{343}	—	September 23, 2000	Socorro	LINEAR	·	3.1 km	MPC · JPL
427431	2000 TM_{30}	—	October 2, 2000	Kitt Peak	Spacewatch	·	1.9 km	MPC · JPL
427432	2000 TE_{38}	—	October 1, 2000	Socorro	LINEAR	·	1.6 km	MPC · JPL
427433	2000 UV_{61}	—	October 25, 2000	Socorro	LINEAR	·	1.4 km	MPC · JPL
427434	2000 WS_{63}	—	November 24, 2000	Kitt Peak	Spacewatch	·	1.8 km	MPC · JPL
427435	2001 BC_{73}	—	January 27, 2001	Haleakala	NEAT	·	3.1 km	MPC · JPL
427436	2001 DK_{55}	—	February 16, 2001	Kitt Peak	Spacewatch	·	500 m	MPC · JPL
427437	2001 FN_{7}	—	March 19, 2001	Kitt Peak	Spacewatch	·	720 m	MPC · JPL
427438	2001 FQ_{40}	—	March 18, 2001	Socorro	LINEAR	·	1.5 km	MPC · JPL
427439	2001 FP_{210}	—	March 21, 2001	Kitt Peak	SKADS	KOR	1.0 km	MPC · JPL
427440	2001 OW_{12}	—	July 21, 2001	Eskridge	G. Hug	·	1.9 km	MPC · JPL
427441	2001 OU_{44}	—	July 23, 2001	Haleakala	NEAT	·	1.5 km	MPC · JPL
427442	2001 PA_{41}	—	August 11, 2001	Palomar	NEAT	·	1.6 km	MPC · JPL
427443	2001 QV_{61}	—	August 16, 2001	Socorro	LINEAR	PHO	2.5 km	MPC · JPL
427444	2001 QD_{87}	—	August 17, 2001	Palomar	NEAT	PHO	2.1 km	MPC · JPL
427445	2001 QA_{110}	—	August 19, 2001	Socorro	LINEAR	·	3.3 km	MPC · JPL
427446	2001 QN_{189}	—	August 22, 2001	Socorro	LINEAR	PHO	940 m	MPC · JPL
427447	2001 RU_{62}	—	September 12, 2001	Socorro	LINEAR	slow	3.6 km	MPC · JPL
427448	2001 RJ_{127}	—	September 12, 2001	Socorro	LINEAR	·	1.6 km	MPC · JPL
427449	2001 RC_{132}	—	September 12, 2001	Socorro	LINEAR	·	3.6 km	MPC · JPL
427450	2001 SC_{6}	—	September 11, 2001	Anderson Mesa	LONEOS	EOS	1.9 km	MPC · JPL
427451	2001 SL_{13}	—	September 16, 2001	Socorro	LINEAR	·	2.7 km	MPC · JPL
427452	2001 SD_{15}	—	September 16, 2001	Socorro	LINEAR	·	1.6 km	MPC · JPL
427453	2001 SS_{103}	—	September 20, 2001	Socorro	LINEAR	·	3.3 km	MPC · JPL
427454	2001 SZ_{185}	—	September 19, 2001	Socorro	LINEAR	LIX	3.3 km	MPC · JPL
427455	2001 SM_{201}	—	September 19, 2001	Socorro	LINEAR	·	1.0 km	MPC · JPL
427456	2001 SQ_{202}	—	September 19, 2001	Socorro	LINEAR	·	1.4 km	MPC · JPL
427457	2001 SO_{212}	—	September 19, 2001	Socorro	LINEAR	·	3.7 km	MPC · JPL
427458	2001 SL_{250}	—	September 19, 2001	Socorro	LINEAR	·	1.5 km	MPC · JPL
427459	2001 SE_{259}	—	September 20, 2001	Socorro	LINEAR	·	3.3 km	MPC · JPL
427460	2001 SP_{299}	—	September 11, 2001	Kitt Peak	Spacewatch	EOS	2.1 km	MPC · JPL
427461	2001 TT_{47}	—	October 14, 2001	Cima Ekar	ADAS	·	1.3 km	MPC · JPL
427462	2001 TW_{132}	—	August 26, 2001	Anderson Mesa	LONEOS	·	1.7 km	MPC · JPL
427463	2001 TO_{219}	—	October 14, 2001	Socorro	LINEAR	·	1.5 km	MPC · JPL
427464	2001 UK_{57}	—	October 17, 2001	Socorro	LINEAR	·	920 m	MPC · JPL
427465	2001 UQ_{127}	—	October 17, 2001	Socorro	LINEAR	·	1.2 km	MPC · JPL
427466	2001 US_{128}	—	October 20, 2001	Socorro	LINEAR	·	3.5 km	MPC · JPL
427467	2001 UA_{201}	—	October 19, 2001	Palomar	NEAT	·	2.8 km	MPC · JPL
427468	2001 UW_{227}	—	October 19, 2001	Palomar	NEAT	·	3.0 km	MPC · JPL
427469	2001 VB_{6}	—	October 21, 2001	Socorro	LINEAR	·	1.6 km	MPC · JPL
427470	2001 VB_{38}	—	November 9, 2001	Socorro	LINEAR	·	940 m	MPC · JPL
427471	2001 VC_{91}	—	November 15, 2001	Socorro	LINEAR	JUN	1.3 km	MPC · JPL
427472	2001 VG_{115}	—	November 12, 2001	Socorro	LINEAR	·	1.5 km	MPC · JPL
427473	2001 VK_{133}	—	November 11, 2001	Apache Point	SDSS	·	810 m	MPC · JPL
427474	2001 WR_{68}	—	November 20, 2001	Socorro	LINEAR	·	3.4 km	MPC · JPL
427475	2001 WT_{68}	—	November 20, 2001	Socorro	LINEAR	·	910 m	MPC · JPL
427476	2001 WB_{75}	—	November 20, 2001	Socorro	LINEAR	·	830 m	MPC · JPL
427477	2001 XH_{4}	—	December 10, 2001	Socorro	LINEAR	·	1.6 km	MPC · JPL
427478	2001 XC_{54}	—	December 10, 2001	Socorro	LINEAR	·	1.2 km	MPC · JPL
427479	2001 XG_{61}	—	December 10, 2001	Socorro	LINEAR	KON	2.9 km	MPC · JPL
427480	2001 XC_{96}	—	December 10, 2001	Socorro	LINEAR	·	1.3 km	MPC · JPL
427481	2001 XE_{114}	—	December 13, 2001	Socorro	LINEAR	·	1.1 km	MPC · JPL
427482	2001 XH_{134}	—	December 14, 2001	Socorro	LINEAR	·	1.6 km	MPC · JPL
427483	2001 XA_{145}	—	December 14, 2001	Socorro	LINEAR	(1547)	1.5 km	MPC · JPL
427484	2001 XT_{149}	—	December 14, 2001	Socorro	LINEAR	BRG	1.6 km	MPC · JPL
427485	2001 XP_{206}	—	December 11, 2001	Socorro	LINEAR	·	1.6 km	MPC · JPL
427486	2001 XQ_{223}	—	November 11, 2001	Socorro	LINEAR	·	1.8 km	MPC · JPL
427487	2002 AY_{35}	—	January 8, 2002	Socorro	LINEAR	·	1.6 km	MPC · JPL
427488	2002 AZ_{42}	—	January 9, 2002	Socorro	LINEAR	·	1.8 km	MPC · JPL
427489	2002 AW_{109}	—	January 9, 2002	Socorro	LINEAR	·	1.4 km	MPC · JPL
427490	2002 AG_{145}	—	January 13, 2002	Socorro	LINEAR	(194)	1.6 km	MPC · JPL
427491	2002 AW_{185}	—	January 8, 2002	Socorro	LINEAR	·	1.4 km	MPC · JPL
427492	2002 AP_{203}	—	January 9, 2002	Kitt Peak	Spacewatch	·	1.6 km	MPC · JPL
427493	2002 BN_{20}	—	January 23, 2002	Socorro	LINEAR	·	2.5 km	MPC · JPL
427494	2002 BK_{26}	—	January 25, 2002	Socorro	LINEAR	·	700 m	MPC · JPL
427495	2002 BN_{30}	—	January 21, 2002	Anderson Mesa	LONEOS	JUN	990 m	MPC · JPL
427496 van de Weg	2002 BF_{32}	van de Weg	January 20, 2002	Palomar	NEAT	·	1.3 km	MPC · JPL
427497	2002 CK_{14}	—	February 7, 2002	Socorro	LINEAR	H	590 m	MPC · JPL
427498	2002 CN_{43}	—	February 6, 2002	Socorro	LINEAR	H	570 m	MPC · JPL
427499	2002 CZ_{58}	—	February 12, 2002	Palomar	NEAT	AMO	510 m	MPC · JPL
427500	2002 CJ_{69}	—	January 13, 2002	Socorro	LINEAR	JUN	1.0 km	MPC · JPL

== 427501–427600 ==
back to top

Designation			Discovery			Properties		Ref
Permanent	Provisional	Named after	Date	Site	Discoverer(s)	Category	Diam.	Ref
427501	2002 CQ_{138}	—	February 8, 2002	Socorro	LINEAR	·	1.5 km	MPC · JPL
427502	2002 CS_{151}	—	February 10, 2002	Socorro	LINEAR	ADE	3.0 km	MPC · JPL
427503	2002 CO_{157}	—	January 14, 2002	Kitt Peak	Spacewatch	EUN	1.3 km	MPC · JPL
427504	2002 CD_{158}	—	February 7, 2002	Socorro	LINEAR	·	2.4 km	MPC · JPL
427505	2002 CL_{159}	—	February 7, 2002	Socorro	LINEAR	H	520 m	MPC · JPL
427506	2002 CR_{162}	—	February 8, 2002	Socorro	LINEAR	·	1.3 km	MPC · JPL
427507	2002 DH_{5}	—	February 20, 2002	Kitt Peak	Spacewatch	centaur	50 km	MPC · JPL
427508	2002 DK_{16}	—	February 20, 2002	Socorro	LINEAR	·	1.7 km	MPC · JPL
427509	2002 DA_{19}	—	February 22, 2002	Palomar	NEAT	H	600 m	MPC · JPL
427510	2002 ES_{6}	—	March 6, 2002	Siding Spring	R. H. McNaught	·	1.5 km	MPC · JPL
427511	2002 EA_{35}	—	March 11, 2002	Palomar	NEAT	EUN	1.3 km	MPC · JPL
427512	2002 EZ_{104}	—	March 9, 2002	Anderson Mesa	LONEOS	·	1.4 km	MPC · JPL
427513	2002 EO_{113}	—	March 10, 2002	Kitt Peak	Spacewatch	EUN	1.4 km	MPC · JPL
427514	2002 EV_{114}	—	March 10, 2002	Kitt Peak	Spacewatch	·	1.4 km	MPC · JPL
427515	2002 FE_{14}	—	March 16, 2002	Socorro	LINEAR	H	620 m	MPC · JPL
427516	2002 GZ_{1}	—	April 4, 2002	Kleť	Kleť	H	530 m	MPC · JPL
427517	2002 GK_{4}	—	April 9, 2002	Socorro	LINEAR	H	650 m	MPC · JPL
427518	2002 GX_{9}	—	April 14, 2002	Socorro	LINEAR	H	640 m	MPC · JPL
427519	2002 GF_{62}	—	April 8, 2002	Palomar	NEAT	JUN	1.0 km	MPC · JPL
427520	2002 GT_{134}	—	April 12, 2002	Socorro	LINEAR	·	1.5 km	MPC · JPL
427521	2002 JK_{20}	—	May 6, 2002	Palomar	NEAT	·	2.4 km	MPC · JPL
427522	2002 JJ_{108}	—	May 14, 2002	Palomar	NEAT	·	1.7 km	MPC · JPL
427523	2002 JQ_{137}	—	May 9, 2002	Palomar	NEAT	H	650 m	MPC · JPL
427524	2002 JE_{141}	—	May 8, 2002	Socorro	LINEAR	·	1.5 km	MPC · JPL
427525	2002 NB_{1}	—	June 20, 2002	Kitt Peak	Spacewatch	H	400 m	MPC · JPL
427526	2002 NF_{31}	—	July 13, 2002	Socorro	LINEAR	PHO	990 m	MPC · JPL
427527	2002 NP_{65}	—	July 5, 2002	Palomar	NEAT	·	1.7 km	MPC · JPL
427528	2002 OL_{7}	—	July 20, 2002	Palomar	NEAT	·	2.7 km	MPC · JPL
427529	2002 OY_{33}	—	July 22, 2002	Palomar	NEAT	·	2.3 km	MPC · JPL
427530	2002 PM_{4}	—	August 4, 2002	Palomar	NEAT	PHO	960 m	MPC · JPL
427531	2002 PG_{173}	—	August 8, 2002	Palomar	NEAT	PHO	710 m	MPC · JPL
427532	2002 PJ_{188}	—	August 8, 2002	Palomar	NEAT	·	2.1 km	MPC · JPL
427533	2002 QM_{16}	—	August 26, 2002	Palomar	NEAT	·	2.5 km	MPC · JPL
427534	2002 QL_{57}	—	August 17, 2002	Palomar	Lowe, A.	·	2.2 km	MPC · JPL
427535	2002 QW_{59}	—	August 16, 2002	Palomar	NEAT	DOR	2.9 km	MPC · JPL
427536	2002 QT_{63}	—	August 28, 2002	Palomar	NEAT	·	970 m	MPC · JPL
427537	2002 QV_{119}	—	August 28, 2002	Palomar	NEAT	·	800 m	MPC · JPL
427538	2002 QK_{135}	—	August 30, 2002	Palomar	NEAT	BRA	1.4 km	MPC · JPL
427539	2002 QN_{137}	—	August 17, 2002	Palomar	NEAT	·	2.4 km	MPC · JPL
427540	2002 QO_{139}	—	August 17, 2002	Palomar	NEAT	·	2.3 km	MPC · JPL
427541	2002 RX_{28}	—	September 2, 2002	Palomar	NEAT	·	2.0 km	MPC · JPL
427542	2002 RC_{167}	—	September 13, 2002	Palomar	NEAT	·	2.2 km	MPC · JPL
427543	2002 RR_{200}	—	September 13, 2002	Socorro	LINEAR	·	1.2 km	MPC · JPL
427544	2002 RZ_{235}	—	September 14, 2002	Palomar	R. Matson	·	760 m	MPC · JPL
427545	2002 RB_{261}	—	September 10, 2002	Palomar	NEAT	H	690 m	MPC · JPL
427546	2002 RB_{272}	—	September 4, 2002	Palomar	NEAT	·	850 m	MPC · JPL
427547	2002 SJ_{4}	—	September 27, 2002	Palomar	NEAT	·	1.2 km	MPC · JPL
427548	2002 SO_{32}	—	September 28, 2002	Haleakala	NEAT	NYS	1.1 km	MPC · JPL
427549	2002 TQ_{11}	—	October 1, 2002	Anderson Mesa	LONEOS	T_{j} (2.92)	2.9 km	MPC · JPL
427550	2002 TZ_{104}	—	October 4, 2002	Socorro	LINEAR	·	1.1 km	MPC · JPL
427551	2002 TM_{204}	—	October 4, 2002	Socorro	LINEAR	·	1.1 km	MPC · JPL
427552	2002 TQ_{213}	—	October 3, 2002	Socorro	LINEAR	·	1.9 km	MPC · JPL
427553	2002 TM_{334}	—	October 5, 2002	Apache Point	SDSS	·	2.2 km	MPC · JPL
427554	2002 TB_{339}	—	October 5, 2002	Apache Point	SDSS	·	800 m	MPC · JPL
427555	2002 TQ_{370}	—	October 10, 2002	Apache Point	SDSS	·	3.6 km	MPC · JPL
427556	2002 UF_{25}	—	October 30, 2002	Haleakala	NEAT	V	770 m	MPC · JPL
427557	2002 UX_{53}	—	October 29, 2002	Apache Point	SDSS	·	2.2 km	MPC · JPL
427558	2002 UA_{60}	—	October 29, 2002	Apache Point	SDSS	·	3.3 km	MPC · JPL
427559	2002 UG_{73}	—	October 29, 2002	Palomar	NEAT	·	1.7 km	MPC · JPL
427560	2002 VA_{47}	—	November 5, 2002	Palomar	NEAT	·	1.2 km	MPC · JPL
427561	2002 VW_{66}	—	November 6, 2002	Socorro	LINEAR	·	1.1 km	MPC · JPL
427562	2002 VB_{78}	—	November 7, 2002	Socorro	LINEAR	·	2.4 km	MPC · JPL
427563	2002 VH_{117}	—	November 13, 2002	Palomar	NEAT	·	3.0 km	MPC · JPL
427564	2002 VD_{146}	—	November 14, 2002	Palomar	NEAT	·	2.5 km	MPC · JPL
427565	2002 WA_{22}	—	November 24, 2002	Palomar	NEAT	·	2.8 km	MPC · JPL
427566	2002 WR_{24}	—	November 16, 2002	Palomar	NEAT	·	3.1 km	MPC · JPL
427567	2003 AG_{53}	—	January 5, 2003	Socorro	LINEAR	·	3.3 km	MPC · JPL
427568	2003 BG_{4}	—	January 23, 2003	La Silla	A. Boattini, H. Scholl	·	3.3 km	MPC · JPL
427569	2003 CR_{25}	—	February 9, 2003	Haleakala	NEAT	CYB	3.1 km	MPC · JPL
427570	2003 EW_{31}	—	March 7, 2003	Socorro	LINEAR	·	1.3 km	MPC · JPL
427571	2003 EB_{43}	—	March 10, 2003	Kitt Peak	Spacewatch	·	1.0 km	MPC · JPL
427572	2003 EW_{62}	—	March 11, 2003	Kitt Peak	Spacewatch	·	1.1 km	MPC · JPL
427573	2003 FO_{16}	—	March 23, 2003	Haleakala	NEAT	·	1.9 km	MPC · JPL
427574	2003 FY_{52}	—	March 25, 2003	Palomar	NEAT	·	1.3 km	MPC · JPL
427575	2003 FX_{132}	—	March 23, 2003	Kitt Peak	Spacewatch	·	990 m	MPC · JPL
427576	2003 OK_{15}	—	June 29, 2003	Socorro	LINEAR	·	2.2 km	MPC · JPL
427577	2003 OS_{18}	—	July 25, 2003	Campo Imperatore	CINEOS	·	2.9 km	MPC · JPL
427578	2003 QT_{4}	—	August 19, 2003	Campo Imperatore	CINEOS	·	2.0 km	MPC · JPL
427579	2003 QY_{14}	—	August 20, 2003	Palomar	NEAT	DOR	2.6 km	MPC · JPL
427580	2003 QC_{29}	—	August 23, 2003	Palomar	NEAT	·	1.2 km	MPC · JPL
427581	2003 QB_{92}	—	August 24, 2003	Cerro Tololo	M. W. Buie	res · 4:5	123 km	MPC · JPL
427582	2003 QF_{93}	—	August 27, 2003	Palomar	NEAT	·	1.2 km	MPC · JPL
427583	2003 QK_{103}	—	August 23, 2003	Socorro	LINEAR	·	860 m	MPC · JPL
427584	2003 RK_{11}	—	September 13, 2003	Haleakala	NEAT	·	680 m	MPC · JPL
427585	2003 RB_{20}	—	September 17, 2003	Kitt Peak	Spacewatch	·	2.0 km	MPC · JPL
427586	2003 SO_{34}	—	September 18, 2003	Kitt Peak	Spacewatch	·	580 m	MPC · JPL
427587	2003 SG_{50}	—	September 18, 2003	Palomar	NEAT	·	1.6 km	MPC · JPL
427588	2003 SF_{67}	—	September 19, 2003	Socorro	LINEAR	V	700 m	MPC · JPL
427589	2003 SU_{74}	—	August 30, 2003	Kitt Peak	Spacewatch	·	1.5 km	MPC · JPL
427590	2003 SW_{75}	—	September 18, 2003	Kitt Peak	Spacewatch	·	1.8 km	MPC · JPL
427591	2003 SQ_{92}	—	September 18, 2003	Kitt Peak	Spacewatch	·	610 m	MPC · JPL
427592	2003 SC_{116}	—	September 16, 2003	Anderson Mesa	LONEOS	·	700 m	MPC · JPL
427593	2003 SU_{116}	—	September 16, 2003	Kitt Peak	Spacewatch	·	780 m	MPC · JPL
427594	2003 SD_{122}	—	September 17, 2003	Campo Imperatore	CINEOS	·	2.4 km	MPC · JPL
427595	2003 SD_{130}	—	September 19, 2003	Kitt Peak	Spacewatch	·	2.7 km	MPC · JPL
427596	2003 SP_{137}	—	September 21, 2003	Campo Imperatore	CINEOS	H	550 m	MPC · JPL
427597	2003 SF_{166}	—	September 21, 2003	Kitt Peak	Spacewatch	·	530 m	MPC · JPL
427598	2003 SM_{178}	—	September 19, 2003	Palomar	NEAT	·	660 m	MPC · JPL
427599	2003 SO_{179}	—	September 19, 2003	Palomar	NEAT	·	830 m	MPC · JPL
427600	2003 SZ_{203}	—	September 17, 2003	Kitt Peak	Spacewatch	·	570 m	MPC · JPL

== 427601–427700 ==
back to top

Designation			Discovery			Properties		Ref
Permanent	Provisional	Named after	Date	Site	Discoverer(s)	Category	Diam.	Ref
427601	2003 SC_{208}	—	September 26, 2003	Junk Bond	Junk Bond	·	580 m	MPC · JPL
427602	2003 SF_{219}	—	September 23, 2003	Palomar	NEAT	·	890 m	MPC · JPL
427603	2003 SV_{219}	—	September 29, 2003	Kitt Peak	Spacewatch	H	440 m	MPC · JPL
427604	2003 SB_{244}	—	September 28, 2003	Kitt Peak	Spacewatch	·	710 m	MPC · JPL
427605	2003 SA_{257}	—	September 28, 2003	Kitt Peak	Spacewatch	·	2.5 km	MPC · JPL
427606	2003 SR_{272}	—	September 19, 2003	Kitt Peak	Spacewatch	·	770 m	MPC · JPL
427607	2003 SO_{280}	—	September 18, 2003	Kitt Peak	Spacewatch	·	660 m	MPC · JPL
427608	2003 SC_{285}	—	September 20, 2003	Socorro	LINEAR	·	2.4 km	MPC · JPL
427609	2003 SX_{301}	—	September 17, 2003	Palomar	NEAT	·	630 m	MPC · JPL
427610	2003 SQ_{353}	—	September 21, 2003	Anderson Mesa	LONEOS	·	830 m	MPC · JPL
427611	2003 SA_{401}	—	September 26, 2003	Apache Point	SDSS	PHO	810 m	MPC · JPL
427612	2003 SQ_{408}	—	September 28, 2003	Kitt Peak	Spacewatch	·	490 m	MPC · JPL
427613	2003 SR_{415}	—	September 28, 2003	Apache Point	SDSS	·	1.7 km	MPC · JPL
427614	2003 SR_{422}	—	September 28, 2003	Cerro Tololo	ESSENCE Collaboration	cubewano (hot) · critical	182 km	MPC · JPL
427615	2003 SK_{429}	—	September 21, 2003	Kitt Peak	Spacewatch	AST	1.6 km	MPC · JPL
427616	2003 SP_{429}	—	September 27, 2003	Kitt Peak	Spacewatch	·	1.9 km	MPC · JPL
427617	2003 SL_{433}	—	September 28, 2003	Anderson Mesa	LONEOS	·	2.5 km	MPC · JPL
427618	2003 TP_{20}	—	October 14, 2003	Palomar	NEAT	·	980 m	MPC · JPL
427619	2003 TL_{47}	—	October 3, 2003	Kitt Peak	Spacewatch	·	630 m	MPC · JPL
427620	2003 UT_{6}	—	October 18, 2003	Palomar	NEAT	H	570 m	MPC · JPL
427621	2003 UN_{12}	—	October 21, 2003	Kitt Peak	Spacewatch	AMO	770 m	MPC · JPL
427622	2003 UT_{25}	—	October 17, 2003	Kitt Peak	Spacewatch	H	440 m	MPC · JPL
427623	2003 UZ_{45}	—	October 18, 2003	Kitt Peak	Spacewatch	·	1.9 km	MPC · JPL
427624	2003 UN_{81}	—	September 3, 2003	Socorro	LINEAR	·	940 m	MPC · JPL
427625	2003 UA_{85}	—	October 18, 2003	Kitt Peak	Spacewatch	·	1.1 km	MPC · JPL
427626	2003 UB_{93}	—	October 20, 2003	Palomar	NEAT	·	2.3 km	MPC · JPL
427627	2003 UZ_{101}	—	September 19, 2003	Anderson Mesa	LONEOS	·	3.0 km	MPC · JPL
427628	2003 UK_{110}	—	October 19, 2003	Kitt Peak	Spacewatch	·	1.6 km	MPC · JPL
427629	2003 UF_{141}	—	October 18, 2003	Anderson Mesa	LONEOS	H	620 m	MPC · JPL
427630	2003 UD_{144}	—	October 18, 2003	Anderson Mesa	LONEOS	·	840 m	MPC · JPL
427631	2003 UO_{147}	—	October 18, 2003	Kitt Peak	Spacewatch	·	980 m	MPC · JPL
427632	2003 UO_{173}	—	October 20, 2003	Kitt Peak	Spacewatch	·	720 m	MPC · JPL
427633	2003 UM_{184}	—	October 21, 2003	Kitt Peak	Spacewatch	·	770 m	MPC · JPL
427634	2003 UV_{184}	—	October 21, 2003	Kitt Peak	Spacewatch	V	850 m	MPC · JPL
427635	2003 UJ_{204}	—	October 2, 2003	Kitt Peak	Spacewatch	NYS	940 m	MPC · JPL
427636	2003 UF_{228}	—	October 16, 2003	Anderson Mesa	LONEOS	·	790 m	MPC · JPL
427637	2003 UL_{229}	—	October 23, 2003	Anderson Mesa	LONEOS	·	770 m	MPC · JPL
427638	2003 UQ_{231}	—	October 24, 2003	Socorro	LINEAR	·	620 m	MPC · JPL
427639	2003 UU_{257}	—	October 25, 2003	Socorro	LINEAR	·	810 m	MPC · JPL
427640	2003 UB_{348}	—	October 19, 2003	Apache Point	SDSS	·	590 m	MPC · JPL
427641	2003 UH_{354}	—	October 19, 2003	Apache Point	SDSS	·	580 m	MPC · JPL
427642	2003 UT_{379}	—	October 22, 2003	Apache Point	SDSS	·	1.8 km	MPC · JPL
427643	2003 VF_{1}	—	November 5, 2003	Socorro	LINEAR	AMO +1km	1.2 km	MPC · JPL
427644	2003 VD_{10}	—	October 25, 2003	Socorro	LINEAR	H	430 m	MPC · JPL
427645	2003 WA_{24}	—	November 18, 2003	Kitt Peak	Spacewatch	·	2.5 km	MPC · JPL
427646	2003 WT_{62}	—	November 19, 2003	Socorro	LINEAR	·	1.8 km	MPC · JPL
427647	2003 WZ_{66}	—	November 19, 2003	Kitt Peak	Spacewatch	·	3.6 km	MPC · JPL
427648	2003 WZ_{96}	—	November 19, 2003	Anderson Mesa	LONEOS	·	650 m	MPC · JPL
427649	2003 XP_{21}	—	December 14, 2003	Kitt Peak	Spacewatch	·	2.2 km	MPC · JPL
427650	2003 YD_{1}	—	December 17, 2003	Socorro	LINEAR	H	540 m	MPC · JPL
427651	2003 YR_{8}	—	December 19, 2003	Socorro	LINEAR	H	690 m	MPC · JPL
427652	2003 YF_{10}	—	December 17, 2003	Socorro	LINEAR	·	830 m	MPC · JPL
427653	2003 YH_{28}	—	December 17, 2003	Palomar	NEAT	·	3.1 km	MPC · JPL
427654	2003 YZ_{40}	—	December 19, 2003	Kitt Peak	Spacewatch	PHO	940 m	MPC · JPL
427655	2003 YA_{43}	—	December 19, 2003	Kitt Peak	Spacewatch	·	1.9 km	MPC · JPL
427656	2003 YX_{73}	—	December 4, 2003	Socorro	LINEAR	·	840 m	MPC · JPL
427657	2003 YR_{144}	—	December 28, 2003	Socorro	LINEAR	·	3.8 km	MPC · JPL
427658	2003 YC_{155}	—	December 30, 2003	Socorro	LINEAR	·	2.2 km	MPC · JPL
427659	2003 YY_{157}	—	December 17, 2003	Kitt Peak	Spacewatch	·	2.2 km	MPC · JPL
427660	2003 YD_{166}	—	December 17, 2003	Kitt Peak	Spacewatch	·	1.7 km	MPC · JPL
427661	2004 BP_{8}	—	December 29, 2003	Kitt Peak	Spacewatch	·	2.7 km	MPC · JPL
427662	2004 BN_{17}	—	January 18, 2004	Palomar	NEAT	PHO	890 m	MPC · JPL
427663	2004 BC_{25}	—	January 19, 2004	Socorro	LINEAR	PHO	1.2 km	MPC · JPL
427664	2004 BU_{36}	—	January 19, 2004	Kitt Peak	Spacewatch	THM	2.2 km	MPC · JPL
427665	2004 BV_{60}	—	January 21, 2004	Socorro	LINEAR	·	3.4 km	MPC · JPL
427666	2004 BJ_{63}	—	December 19, 2003	Kitt Peak	Spacewatch	·	3.4 km	MPC · JPL
427667	2004 BF_{64}	—	January 22, 2004	Socorro	LINEAR	NYS	700 m	MPC · JPL
427668	2004 BA_{79}	—	January 22, 2004	Socorro	LINEAR	NYS	860 m	MPC · JPL
427669	2004 BE_{83}	—	January 28, 2004	Kitt Peak	Spacewatch	·	1.0 km	MPC · JPL
427670	2004 BV_{130}	—	December 18, 2003	Kitt Peak	Spacewatch	·	3.2 km	MPC · JPL
427671	2004 BR_{132}	—	January 17, 2004	Kitt Peak	Spacewatch	·	3.3 km	MPC · JPL
427672	2004 BV_{137}	—	January 19, 2004	Kitt Peak	Spacewatch	TEL	1.5 km	MPC · JPL
427673	2004 BG_{142}	—	January 19, 2004	Kitt Peak	Spacewatch	EOS	3.1 km	MPC · JPL
427674	2004 CU_{20}	—	February 11, 2004	Kitt Peak	Spacewatch	NYS	950 m	MPC · JPL
427675	2004 CP_{28}	—	January 22, 2004	Socorro	LINEAR	·	2.2 km	MPC · JPL
427676	2004 CZ_{46}	—	February 13, 2004	Kitt Peak	Spacewatch	·	1.0 km	MPC · JPL
427677	2004 CY_{60}	—	January 28, 2004	Catalina	CSS	·	1.3 km	MPC · JPL
427678	2004 CT_{63}	—	February 13, 2004	Palomar	NEAT	·	4.6 km	MPC · JPL
427679	2004 CV_{71}	—	February 13, 2004	Palomar	NEAT	·	3.0 km	MPC · JPL
427680	2004 CD_{84}	—	February 12, 2004	Kitt Peak	Spacewatch	·	950 m	MPC · JPL
427681	2004 CU_{108}	—	February 15, 2004	Catalina	CSS	·	2.8 km	MPC · JPL
427682	2004 CN_{122}	—	February 12, 2004	Kitt Peak	Spacewatch	VER	2.7 km	MPC · JPL
427683	2004 CA_{128}	—	February 13, 2004	Kitt Peak	Spacewatch	·	2.5 km	MPC · JPL
427684	2004 DH_{2}	—	February 19, 2004	Socorro	LINEAR	ATE	320 m	MPC · JPL
427685	2004 DJ_{44}	—	February 25, 2004	Desert Eagle	W. K. Y. Yeung	·	3.2 km	MPC · JPL
427686	2004 DB_{52}	—	February 23, 2004	Socorro	LINEAR	·	1.0 km	MPC · JPL
427687	2004 DB_{55}	—	February 12, 2004	Kitt Peak	Spacewatch	EOS	2.0 km	MPC · JPL
427688	2004 ET	—	March 13, 2004	Wrightwood	J. W. Young	NYS	1.1 km	MPC · JPL
427689	2004 EB_{19}	—	March 14, 2004	Socorro	LINEAR	·	3.7 km	MPC · JPL
427690	2004 EB_{36}	—	March 13, 2004	Palomar	NEAT	·	3.6 km	MPC · JPL
427691	2004 EW_{41}	—	March 15, 2004	Catalina	CSS	·	3.1 km	MPC · JPL
427692	2004 EW_{46}	—	March 15, 2004	Kitt Peak	Spacewatch	MAS	580 m	MPC · JPL
427693	2004 EH_{76}	—	March 15, 2004	Kitt Peak	Spacewatch	T_{j} (2.99)	4.8 km	MPC · JPL
427694	2004 ED_{87}	—	February 17, 2004	Kitt Peak	Spacewatch	·	4.3 km	MPC · JPL
427695 Johnpazder	2004 FV_{16}	Johnpazder	March 16, 2004	Mauna Kea	D. D. Balam	·	3.1 km	MPC · JPL
427696	2004 FJ_{17}	—	March 26, 2004	Goodricke-Pigott	Goodricke-Pigott	·	2.4 km	MPC · JPL
427697	2004 FL_{24}	—	March 17, 2004	Socorro	LINEAR	·	4.2 km	MPC · JPL
427698	2004 FH_{30}	—	March 19, 2004	Catalina	CSS	PHO	940 m	MPC · JPL
427699	2004 FR_{31}	—	March 30, 2004	Socorro	LINEAR	·	4.0 km	MPC · JPL
427700	2004 FJ_{32}	—	March 30, 2004	Socorro	LINEAR	·	1.8 km	MPC · JPL

== 427701–427800 ==
back to top

Designation			Discovery			Properties		Ref
Permanent	Provisional	Named after	Date	Site	Discoverer(s)	Category	Diam.	Ref
427701	2004 FG_{38}	—	March 17, 2004	Socorro	LINEAR	·	3.1 km	MPC · JPL
427702	2004 FV_{46}	—	March 17, 2004	Kitt Peak	Spacewatch	NYS	1.3 km	MPC · JPL
427703	2004 FA_{58}	—	March 17, 2004	Socorro	LINEAR	·	3.4 km	MPC · JPL
427704	2004 FH_{63}	—	March 19, 2004	Socorro	LINEAR	·	3.4 km	MPC · JPL
427705	2004 FT_{66}	—	March 20, 2004	Socorro	LINEAR	V	900 m	MPC · JPL
427706	2004 FL_{79}	—	March 19, 2004	Kitt Peak	Spacewatch	·	2.4 km	MPC · JPL
427707	2004 FP_{96}	—	March 23, 2004	Socorro	LINEAR	·	3.5 km	MPC · JPL
427708	2004 FZ_{102}	—	March 23, 2004	Kitt Peak	Spacewatch	·	2.6 km	MPC · JPL
427709	2004 FH_{104}	—	March 23, 2004	Kitt Peak	Spacewatch	MAS	590 m	MPC · JPL
427710	2004 FT_{118}	—	March 22, 2004	Socorro	LINEAR	·	1.4 km	MPC · JPL
427711	2004 FP_{128}	—	March 27, 2004	Kitt Peak	Spacewatch	·	3.2 km	MPC · JPL
427712	2004 FQ_{132}	—	March 23, 2004	Kitt Peak	Spacewatch	·	2.2 km	MPC · JPL
427713	2004 FM_{140}	—	March 27, 2004	Kitt Peak	Spacewatch	H	440 m	MPC · JPL
427714	2004 FH_{144}	—	March 29, 2004	Socorro	LINEAR	·	3.7 km	MPC · JPL
427715	2004 FB_{152}	—	March 17, 2004	Kitt Peak	Spacewatch	NYS	1.1 km	MPC · JPL
427716	2004 GW_{2}	—	April 12, 2004	Desert Eagle	W. K. Y. Yeung	·	3.1 km	MPC · JPL
427717	2004 GN_{33}	—	April 12, 2004	Kitt Peak	Spacewatch	·	2.7 km	MPC · JPL
427718	2004 GY_{51}	—	April 13, 2004	Kitt Peak	Spacewatch	·	1.0 km	MPC · JPL
427719	2004 GN_{66}	—	March 23, 2004	Kitt Peak	Spacewatch	VER	2.9 km	MPC · JPL
427720	2004 HP_{2}	—	April 19, 2004	Socorro	LINEAR	H	630 m	MPC · JPL
427721	2004 HN_{32}	—	March 31, 2004	Kitt Peak	Spacewatch	·	1.3 km	MPC · JPL
427722	2004 HJ_{39}	—	April 17, 2004	Kitt Peak	Spacewatch	·	1.3 km	MPC · JPL
427723	2004 HW_{56}	—	April 27, 2004	Socorro	LINEAR	·	3.6 km	MPC · JPL
427724	2004 JW_{31}	—	May 13, 2004	Socorro	LINEAR	·	1.5 km	MPC · JPL
427725	2004 NZ_{3}	—	July 11, 2004	Palomar	NEAT	·	1.3 km	MPC · JPL
427726	2004 NJ_{5}	—	July 10, 2004	Catalina	CSS	·	2.3 km	MPC · JPL
427727	2004 NF_{21}	—	July 14, 2004	Socorro	LINEAR	·	1.8 km	MPC · JPL
427728	2004 PJ_{12}	—	August 7, 2004	Palomar	NEAT	·	1.5 km	MPC · JPL
427729	2004 PL_{18}	—	August 8, 2004	Anderson Mesa	LONEOS	·	1.6 km	MPC · JPL
427730	2004 PO_{65}	—	August 10, 2004	Anderson Mesa	LONEOS	·	1.7 km	MPC · JPL
427731	2004 PU_{79}	—	July 17, 2004	Socorro	LINEAR	·	1.9 km	MPC · JPL
427732	2004 PN_{84}	—	August 10, 2004	Anderson Mesa	LONEOS	·	1.2 km	MPC · JPL
427733	2004 PQ_{84}	—	July 29, 2004	Siding Spring	SSS	(1547)	2.0 km	MPC · JPL
427734	2004 QA_{13}	—	August 21, 2004	Siding Spring	SSS	·	1.5 km	MPC · JPL
427735	2004 RO_{33}	—	September 7, 2004	Socorro	LINEAR	·	1.7 km	MPC · JPL
427736	2004 RL_{41}	—	September 7, 2004	Socorro	LINEAR	·	1.8 km	MPC · JPL
427737	2004 RE_{52}	—	September 8, 2004	Socorro	LINEAR	·	1.3 km	MPC · JPL
427738	2004 RZ_{65}	—	August 13, 2004	Socorro	LINEAR	·	2.1 km	MPC · JPL
427739	2004 RA_{71}	—	September 8, 2004	Socorro	LINEAR	·	1.5 km	MPC · JPL
427740	2004 RA_{82}	—	September 8, 2004	Palomar	NEAT	·	1.7 km	MPC · JPL
427741	2004 RQ_{88}	—	September 8, 2004	Socorro	LINEAR	·	1.7 km	MPC · JPL
427742	2004 RB_{96}	—	August 25, 2004	Kitt Peak	Spacewatch	EUN	1.3 km	MPC · JPL
427743	2004 RV_{113}	—	August 9, 2004	Socorro	LINEAR	·	2.2 km	MPC · JPL
427744	2004 RM_{125}	—	September 7, 2004	Kitt Peak	Spacewatch	EUN	1.2 km	MPC · JPL
427745	2004 RE_{133}	—	September 7, 2004	Kitt Peak	Spacewatch	·	1.3 km	MPC · JPL
427746	2004 RS_{157}	—	September 10, 2004	Socorro	LINEAR	·	1.7 km	MPC · JPL
427747	2004 RM_{197}	—	September 10, 2004	Socorro	LINEAR	·	1.8 km	MPC · JPL
427748	2004 RY_{289}	—	September 9, 2004	Socorro	LINEAR	·	1.8 km	MPC · JPL
427749	2004 RM_{319}	—	September 13, 2004	Kitt Peak	Spacewatch	·	1.8 km	MPC · JPL
427750	2004 RY_{324}	—	September 13, 2004	Socorro	LINEAR	·	2.0 km	MPC · JPL
427751	2004 SD_{12}	—	September 16, 2004	Siding Spring	SSS	·	1.7 km	MPC · JPL
427752	2004 SZ_{34}	—	September 17, 2004	Kitt Peak	Spacewatch	·	1.5 km	MPC · JPL
427753	2004 SR_{36}	—	August 23, 2004	Kitt Peak	Spacewatch	·	1.2 km	MPC · JPL
427754	2004 SY_{51}	—	September 17, 2004	Socorro	LINEAR	·	2.2 km	MPC · JPL
427755	2004 SQ_{53}	—	September 22, 2004	Socorro	LINEAR	·	1.9 km	MPC · JPL
427756	2004 TH_{3}	—	October 4, 2004	Kitt Peak	Spacewatch	·	670 m	MPC · JPL
427757	2004 TV_{13}	—	October 8, 2004	Anderson Mesa	LONEOS	·	2.2 km	MPC · JPL
427758	2004 TF_{40}	—	September 10, 2004	Kitt Peak	Spacewatch	MIS	2.4 km	MPC · JPL
427759	2004 TC_{58}	—	September 22, 2004	Socorro	LINEAR	EUN	1.2 km	MPC · JPL
427760	2004 TM_{61}	—	October 5, 2004	Anderson Mesa	LONEOS	·	1.5 km	MPC · JPL
427761	2004 TU_{68}	—	October 5, 2004	Anderson Mesa	LONEOS	·	2.7 km	MPC · JPL
427762	2004 TT_{106}	—	October 7, 2004	Socorro	LINEAR	MIS	3.0 km	MPC · JPL
427763	2004 TJ_{138}	—	October 9, 2004	Anderson Mesa	LONEOS	·	1.8 km	MPC · JPL
427764	2004 TP_{148}	—	October 6, 2004	Kitt Peak	Spacewatch	·	1.3 km	MPC · JPL
427765	2004 TD_{149}	—	October 6, 2004	Kitt Peak	Spacewatch	·	1.9 km	MPC · JPL
427766	2004 TE_{183}	—	September 10, 2004	Kitt Peak	Spacewatch	WIT	1.2 km	MPC · JPL
427767	2004 TG_{183}	—	October 7, 2004	Kitt Peak	Spacewatch	·	1.3 km	MPC · JPL
427768	2004 TR_{202}	—	October 7, 2004	Kitt Peak	Spacewatch	·	2.3 km	MPC · JPL
427769	2004 TA_{256}	—	October 9, 2004	Palomar	NEAT	·	2.6 km	MPC · JPL
427770	2004 TA_{334}	—	October 9, 2004	Kitt Peak	Spacewatch	HOF	2.6 km	MPC · JPL
427771	2004 VR_{1}	—	November 4, 2004	Needville	J. Dellinger, Garossino, P.	·	2.3 km	MPC · JPL
427772	2004 VK_{22}	—	November 4, 2004	Kitt Peak	Spacewatch	(18466)	3.2 km	MPC · JPL
427773	2004 VU_{98}	—	November 9, 2004	Mauna Kea	Veillet, C.	·	1.2 km	MPC · JPL
427774	2004 XZ_{3}	—	November 10, 2004	Kitt Peak	Spacewatch	·	2.1 km	MPC · JPL
427775	2004 XN_{141}	—	December 14, 2004	Socorro	LINEAR	·	2.6 km	MPC · JPL
427776	2004 YE_{36}	—	December 21, 2004	Catalina	CSS	·	3.4 km	MPC · JPL
427777	2005 AC_{20}	—	January 6, 2005	Socorro	LINEAR	·	3.0 km	MPC · JPL
427778	2005 BE	—	January 16, 2005	Catalina	CSS	ATE	340 m	MPC · JPL
427779	2005 BF_{17}	—	January 16, 2005	Kitt Peak	Spacewatch	·	710 m	MPC · JPL
427780	2005 CU_{29}	—	February 1, 2005	Kitt Peak	Spacewatch	H	560 m	MPC · JPL
427781	2005 CJ_{32}	—	February 1, 2005	Kitt Peak	Spacewatch	·	1.4 km	MPC · JPL
427782	2005 CO_{36}	—	January 19, 2005	Kitt Peak	Spacewatch	(2076)	760 m	MPC · JPL
427783	2005 EN_{37}	—	March 4, 2005	Kitt Peak	Spacewatch	·	1.1 km	MPC · JPL
427784	2005 EL_{56}	—	March 4, 2005	Kitt Peak	Spacewatch	·	610 m	MPC · JPL
427785	2005 EC_{83}	—	March 4, 2005	Kitt Peak	Spacewatch	·	720 m	MPC · JPL
427786	2005 ER_{90}	—	March 8, 2005	Socorro	LINEAR	·	860 m	MPC · JPL
427787	2005 ES_{162}	—	March 10, 2005	Mount Lemmon	Mount Lemmon Survey	·	650 m	MPC · JPL
427788	2005 EU_{166}	—	March 4, 2005	Kitt Peak	Spacewatch	·	770 m	MPC · JPL
427789	2005 EC_{182}	—	March 9, 2005	Socorro	LINEAR	·	670 m	MPC · JPL
427790	2005 EE_{243}	—	March 11, 2005	Kitt Peak	Spacewatch	·	1.9 km	MPC · JPL
427791	2005 EO_{245}	—	March 12, 2005	Kitt Peak	Spacewatch	·	620 m	MPC · JPL
427792	2005 EN_{271}	—	March 13, 2005	Catalina	CSS	·	3.4 km	MPC · JPL
427793	2005 ED_{327}	—	March 11, 2005	Kitt Peak	Spacewatch	EOS	2.0 km	MPC · JPL
427794	2005 ES_{327}	—	March 12, 2005	Kitt Peak	Spacewatch	EOS	2.3 km	MPC · JPL
427795	2005 FL	—	March 16, 2005	Catalina	CSS	H	560 m	MPC · JPL
427796	2005 GK_{34}	—	April 1, 2005	Kitt Peak	Spacewatch	·	560 m	MPC · JPL
427797	2005 GS_{48}	—	April 5, 2005	Mount Lemmon	Mount Lemmon Survey	·	2.3 km	MPC · JPL
427798	2005 GJ_{58}	—	April 6, 2005	Mount Lemmon	Mount Lemmon Survey	·	2.4 km	MPC · JPL
427799	2005 GX_{65}	—	April 2, 2005	Catalina	CSS	·	4.7 km	MPC · JPL
427800	2005 GF_{76}	—	April 5, 2005	Catalina	CSS	·	3.0 km	MPC · JPL

== 427801–427900 ==
back to top

Designation			Discovery			Properties		Ref
Permanent	Provisional	Named after	Date	Site	Discoverer(s)	Category	Diam.	Ref
427801	2005 GP_{88}	—	April 5, 2005	Mount Lemmon	Mount Lemmon Survey	·	1.4 km	MPC · JPL
427802	2005 GY_{101}	—	April 9, 2005	Socorro	LINEAR	·	3.2 km	MPC · JPL
427803	2005 GG_{110}	—	April 10, 2005	Mount Lemmon	Mount Lemmon Survey	·	550 m	MPC · JPL
427804	2005 GG_{113}	—	April 8, 2005	Socorro	LINEAR	·	2.5 km	MPC · JPL
427805	2005 GS_{116}	—	April 11, 2005	Kitt Peak	Spacewatch	EOS	1.9 km	MPC · JPL
427806	2005 GE_{127}	—	April 12, 2005	Anderson Mesa	LONEOS	·	3.6 km	MPC · JPL
427807	2005 GH_{130}	—	April 7, 2005	Kitt Peak	Spacewatch	·	640 m	MPC · JPL
427808	2005 GE_{142}	—	April 10, 2005	Kitt Peak	Spacewatch	·	770 m	MPC · JPL
427809	2005 GG_{169}	—	April 12, 2005	Kitt Peak	Spacewatch	·	2.5 km	MPC · JPL
427810	2005 GY_{169}	—	March 10, 2005	Mount Lemmon	Mount Lemmon Survey	·	2.8 km	MPC · JPL
427811	2005 GT_{171}	—	April 2, 2005	Catalina	CSS	·	3.3 km	MPC · JPL
427812	2005 GS_{179}	—	April 1, 2005	Catalina	CSS	T_{j} (2.98)	4.6 km	MPC · JPL
427813	2005 GC_{180}	—	April 7, 2005	Catalina	CSS	H	670 m	MPC · JPL
427814	2005 GV_{189}	—	April 12, 2005	Kitt Peak	M. W. Buie	·	4.3 km	MPC · JPL
427815	2005 GS_{223}	—	April 13, 2005	Socorro	LINEAR	·	650 m	MPC · JPL
427816	2005 GX_{225}	—	April 6, 2005	Mount Lemmon	Mount Lemmon Survey	·	2.0 km	MPC · JPL
427817	2005 HD_{5}	—	April 30, 2005	Kitt Peak	Spacewatch	·	740 m	MPC · JPL
427818	2005 HG_{6}	—	April 30, 2005	Kitt Peak	Spacewatch	·	3.0 km	MPC · JPL
427819	2005 JG_{22}	—	May 4, 2005	Catalina	CSS	·	900 m	MPC · JPL
427820	2005 JU_{24}	—	May 3, 2005	Kitt Peak	Spacewatch	·	610 m	MPC · JPL
427821	2005 JG_{55}	—	May 4, 2005	Kitt Peak	Spacewatch	·	790 m	MPC · JPL
427822	2005 JO_{64}	—	May 4, 2005	Palomar	NEAT	·	4.3 km	MPC · JPL
427823	2005 JV_{69}	—	May 7, 2005	Kitt Peak	Spacewatch	·	3.2 km	MPC · JPL
427824	2005 JC_{78}	—	April 30, 2005	Kitt Peak	Spacewatch	·	610 m	MPC · JPL
427825	2005 JD_{78}	—	April 30, 2005	Kitt Peak	Spacewatch	·	3.2 km	MPC · JPL
427826	2005 JO_{80}	—	May 10, 2005	Kitt Peak	Spacewatch	·	4.7 km	MPC · JPL
427827	2005 JT_{80}	—	May 6, 2005	Anderson Mesa	LONEOS	·	4.9 km	MPC · JPL
427828	2005 JB_{100}	—	January 1, 1998	Kitt Peak	Spacewatch	·	4.8 km	MPC · JPL
427829	2005 JD_{103}	—	May 9, 2005	Kitt Peak	Spacewatch	·	2.7 km	MPC · JPL
427830	2005 JB_{108}	—	May 12, 2005	Socorro	LINEAR	·	1.9 km	MPC · JPL
427831	2005 JQ_{108}	—	May 4, 2005	Kitt Peak	Deep Lens Survey	T_{j} (2.99)	3.1 km	MPC · JPL
427832	2005 JO_{111}	—	May 9, 2005	Kitt Peak	Spacewatch	V	730 m	MPC · JPL
427833	2005 JH_{112}	—	May 9, 2005	Catalina	CSS	LIX	4.2 km	MPC · JPL
427834	2005 JY_{114}	—	May 10, 2005	Kitt Peak	Spacewatch	·	3.4 km	MPC · JPL
427835	2005 JG_{120}	—	May 10, 2005	Kitt Peak	Spacewatch	·	590 m	MPC · JPL
427836	2005 JN_{123}	—	May 11, 2005	Kitt Peak	Spacewatch	·	2.2 km	MPC · JPL
427837	2005 JQ_{132}	—	May 3, 2005	Kitt Peak	Spacewatch	·	1.1 km	MPC · JPL
427838	2005 JM_{145}	—	May 14, 2005	Socorro	LINEAR	H	650 m	MPC · JPL
427839	2005 JU_{153}	—	May 4, 2005	Kitt Peak	Spacewatch	·	2.1 km	MPC · JPL
427840	2005 LE_{4}	—	June 1, 2005	Kitt Peak	Spacewatch	·	3.2 km	MPC · JPL
427841	2005 LD_{9}	—	May 19, 2005	Mount Lemmon	Mount Lemmon Survey	EOS	1.7 km	MPC · JPL
427842	2005 LT_{11}	—	June 3, 2005	Kitt Peak	Spacewatch	·	4.6 km	MPC · JPL
427843	2005 LN_{22}	—	June 8, 2005	Kitt Peak	Spacewatch	·	610 m	MPC · JPL
427844	2005 LZ_{24}	—	May 16, 2005	Mount Lemmon	Mount Lemmon Survey	V	560 m	MPC · JPL
427845	2005 LH_{52}	—	June 15, 2005	Mount Lemmon	Mount Lemmon Survey	·	4.4 km	MPC · JPL
427846	2005 MN_{8}	—	June 28, 2005	Palomar	NEAT	·	3.6 km	MPC · JPL
427847	2005 ME_{18}	—	June 27, 2005	Kitt Peak	Spacewatch	·	920 m	MPC · JPL
427848	2005 MC_{24}	—	June 27, 2005	Kitt Peak	Spacewatch	PHO	780 m	MPC · JPL
427849	2005 MP_{30}	—	June 29, 2005	Kitt Peak	Spacewatch	·	3.7 km	MPC · JPL
427850	2005 MQ_{30}	—	June 29, 2005	Kitt Peak	Spacewatch	·	3.9 km	MPC · JPL
427851	2005 MD_{37}	—	June 30, 2005	Kitt Peak	Spacewatch	·	3.8 km	MPC · JPL
427852	2005 MT_{49}	—	June 30, 2005	Kitt Peak	Spacewatch	·	800 m	MPC · JPL
427853	2005 MJ_{54}	—	June 30, 2005	Palomar	NEAT	PHO	1.1 km	MPC · JPL
427854	2005 NK_{47}	—	July 7, 2005	Kitt Peak	Spacewatch	·	980 m	MPC · JPL
427855	2005 NN_{67}	—	July 3, 2005	Apache Point	Apache Point	·	2.7 km	MPC · JPL
427856	2005 NZ_{67}	—	July 3, 2005	Mount Lemmon	Mount Lemmon Survey	·	850 m	MPC · JPL
427857	2005 NP_{76}	—	July 10, 2005	Kitt Peak	Spacewatch	·	1.3 km	MPC · JPL
427858	2005 NR_{93}	—	June 14, 2005	Mount Lemmon	Mount Lemmon Survey	NYS	810 m	MPC · JPL
427859	2005 NA_{120}	—	July 7, 2005	Mauna Kea	Veillet, C.	V	580 m	MPC · JPL
427860	2005 OJ_{28}	—	July 30, 2005	Palomar	NEAT	·	1.4 km	MPC · JPL
427861	2005 OV_{31}	—	July 25, 2005	Siding Spring	SSS	·	1.1 km	MPC · JPL
427862	2005 PV_{4}	—	August 7, 2005	Siding Spring	SSS	·	1.4 km	MPC · JPL
427863	2005 PD_{12}	—	August 4, 2005	Palomar	NEAT	MAS	650 m	MPC · JPL
427864	2005 QH_{10}	—	August 25, 2005	Campo Imperatore	CINEOS	H	450 m	MPC · JPL
427865	2005 QN_{27}	—	August 27, 2005	Kitt Peak	Spacewatch	·	1.2 km	MPC · JPL
427866	2005 QV_{59}	—	August 25, 2005	Palomar	NEAT	ERI	1.6 km	MPC · JPL
427867	2005 QP_{90}	—	August 25, 2005	Palomar	NEAT	·	1.2 km	MPC · JPL
427868	2005 QD_{95}	—	August 27, 2005	Palomar	NEAT	·	1.1 km	MPC · JPL
427869	2005 QT_{99}	—	August 27, 2005	Palomar	NEAT	·	3.4 km	MPC · JPL
427870	2005 QJ_{131}	—	August 28, 2005	Kitt Peak	Spacewatch	·	1.1 km	MPC · JPL
427871	2005 RM_{27}	—	September 10, 2005	Anderson Mesa	LONEOS	·	2.1 km	MPC · JPL
427872	2005 ST_{5}	—	September 23, 2005	Catalina	CSS	·	1.4 km	MPC · JPL
427873	2005 SK_{29}	—	September 23, 2005	Kitt Peak	Spacewatch	RAF	880 m	MPC · JPL
427874	2005 SC_{32}	—	September 23, 2005	Kitt Peak	Spacewatch	·	1.2 km	MPC · JPL
427875	2005 SU_{57}	—	September 26, 2005	Kitt Peak	Spacewatch	·	1.5 km	MPC · JPL
427876	2005 SZ_{84}	—	September 24, 2005	Kitt Peak	Spacewatch	·	790 m	MPC · JPL
427877	2005 SE_{102}	—	September 25, 2005	Kitt Peak	Spacewatch	·	1.0 km	MPC · JPL
427878	2005 SH_{115}	—	September 27, 2005	Kitt Peak	Spacewatch	MAS	660 m	MPC · JPL
427879	2005 SO_{147}	—	September 25, 2005	Kitt Peak	Spacewatch	·	900 m	MPC · JPL
427880	2005 SZ_{148}	—	September 25, 2005	Kitt Peak	Spacewatch	MAS	730 m	MPC · JPL
427881	2005 SC_{149}	—	September 25, 2005	Kitt Peak	Spacewatch	·	1.2 km	MPC · JPL
427882	2005 SQ_{156}	—	September 26, 2005	Kitt Peak	Spacewatch	·	790 m	MPC · JPL
427883	2005 SB_{178}	—	September 29, 2005	Kitt Peak	Spacewatch	·	1.0 km	MPC · JPL
427884	2005 ST_{191}	—	September 29, 2005	Mount Lemmon	Mount Lemmon Survey	·	1.1 km	MPC · JPL
427885	2005 SR_{218}	—	September 30, 2005	Palomar	NEAT	·	1.4 km	MPC · JPL
427886	2005 SC_{236}	—	September 29, 2005	Kitt Peak	Spacewatch	·	1.2 km	MPC · JPL
427887	2005 SP_{289}	—	September 28, 2005	Palomar	NEAT	·	1.0 km	MPC · JPL
427888	2005 SU_{289}	—	September 30, 2005	Catalina	CSS	·	1.5 km	MPC · JPL
427889	2005 TV_{9}	—	October 1, 2005	Anderson Mesa	LONEOS	·	1.9 km	MPC · JPL
427890	2005 TH_{15}	—	October 1, 2005	Catalina	CSS	H	640 m	MPC · JPL
427891	2005 TC_{40}	—	October 1, 2005	Kitt Peak	Spacewatch	·	850 m	MPC · JPL
427892	2005 TQ_{77}	—	October 6, 2005	Catalina	CSS	EUN	1.2 km	MPC · JPL
427893	2005 TA_{80}	—	October 2, 2005	Mount Lemmon	Mount Lemmon Survey	·	890 m	MPC · JPL
427894	2005 UA_{2}	—	October 22, 2005	Goodricke-Pigott	R. A. Tucker	·	1.1 km	MPC · JPL
427895	2005 UN_{20}	—	October 22, 2005	Catalina	CSS	·	1.6 km	MPC · JPL
427896	2005 UD_{36}	—	October 24, 2005	Kitt Peak	Spacewatch	3:2	3.7 km	MPC · JPL
427897	2005 UK_{37}	—	October 24, 2005	Kitt Peak	Spacewatch	·	1.4 km	MPC · JPL
427898	2005 UA_{94}	—	October 22, 2005	Kitt Peak	Spacewatch	·	1.1 km	MPC · JPL
427899	2005 UB_{97}	—	October 22, 2005	Kitt Peak	Spacewatch	·	1.7 km	MPC · JPL
427900	2005 UB_{101}	—	October 22, 2005	Kitt Peak	Spacewatch	·	1.3 km	MPC · JPL

== 427901–428000 ==
back to top

Designation			Discovery			Properties		Ref
Permanent	Provisional	Named after	Date	Site	Discoverer(s)	Category	Diam.	Ref
427901	2005 UB_{103}	—	October 22, 2005	Kitt Peak	Spacewatch	·	820 m	MPC · JPL
427902	2005 UT_{126}	—	October 24, 2005	Kitt Peak	Spacewatch	3:2 · SHU	4.4 km	MPC · JPL
427903	2005 UD_{132}	—	October 24, 2005	Palomar	NEAT	·	1.0 km	MPC · JPL
427904	2005 UC_{154}	—	October 26, 2005	Kitt Peak	Spacewatch	·	930 m	MPC · JPL
427905	2005 UM_{173}	—	October 24, 2005	Kitt Peak	Spacewatch	·	1.2 km	MPC · JPL
427906	2005 UU_{186}	—	October 26, 2005	Kitt Peak	Spacewatch	·	1.0 km	MPC · JPL
427907	2005 UK_{229}	—	October 25, 2005	Kitt Peak	Spacewatch	·	1 km	MPC · JPL
427908	2005 US_{237}	—	October 25, 2005	Kitt Peak	Spacewatch	·	960 m	MPC · JPL
427909	2005 UF_{238}	—	October 25, 2005	Kitt Peak	Spacewatch	(5)	1.2 km	MPC · JPL
427910	2005 UZ_{241}	—	October 25, 2005	Kitt Peak	Spacewatch	·	2.4 km	MPC · JPL
427911	2005 UK_{266}	—	October 27, 2005	Kitt Peak	Spacewatch	·	1.0 km	MPC · JPL
427912	2005 US_{280}	—	October 24, 2005	Kitt Peak	Spacewatch	·	1.5 km	MPC · JPL
427913	2005 UU_{288}	—	October 26, 2005	Kitt Peak	Spacewatch	·	1.9 km	MPC · JPL
427914	2005 UF_{314}	—	September 3, 2005	Catalina	CSS	·	680 m	MPC · JPL
427915	2005 UC_{331}	—	October 29, 2005	Catalina	CSS	EUN	1.3 km	MPC · JPL
427916	2005 UZ_{333}	—	October 29, 2005	Mount Lemmon	Mount Lemmon Survey	(5)	1.2 km	MPC · JPL
427917	2005 UO_{365}	—	October 27, 2005	Kitt Peak	Spacewatch	(5)	910 m	MPC · JPL
427918	2005 UF_{393}	—	October 30, 2005	Mount Lemmon	Mount Lemmon Survey	NYS	1.2 km	MPC · JPL
427919	2005 UF_{397}	—	October 28, 2005	Socorro	LINEAR	·	1.5 km	MPC · JPL
427920	2005 UG_{398}	—	October 30, 2005	Catalina	CSS	·	3.3 km	MPC · JPL
427921	2005 UK_{406}	—	October 30, 2005	Kitt Peak	Spacewatch	3:2 · SHU	3.9 km	MPC · JPL
427922	2005 UV_{500}	—	October 27, 2005	Catalina	CSS	·	1.5 km	MPC · JPL
427923	2005 UM_{508}	—	October 27, 2005	Anderson Mesa	LONEOS	(5)	1.1 km	MPC · JPL
427924	2005 UY_{522}	—	October 27, 2005	Apache Point	A. C. Becker	T_{j} (2.99) · 3:2	4.0 km	MPC · JPL
427925	2005 UM_{523}	—	October 27, 2005	Apache Point	A. C. Becker	·	1 km	MPC · JPL
427926	2005 UQ_{524}	—	October 24, 2005	Kitt Peak	Spacewatch	·	1.1 km	MPC · JPL
427927	2005 UE_{530}	—	October 27, 2005	Kitt Peak	Spacewatch	·	1.0 km	MPC · JPL
427928	2005 VQ_{1}	—	November 4, 2005	Wrightwood	J. W. Young	JUN	1.1 km	MPC · JPL
427929	2005 VQ_{3}	—	November 1, 2005	Anderson Mesa	LONEOS	·	1.9 km	MPC · JPL
427930	2005 VL_{26}	—	November 3, 2005	Mount Lemmon	Mount Lemmon Survey	·	820 m	MPC · JPL
427931	2005 VC_{28}	—	November 4, 2005	Kitt Peak	Spacewatch	·	1.0 km	MPC · JPL
427932	2005 VS_{33}	—	November 2, 2005	Mount Lemmon	Mount Lemmon Survey	·	1.1 km	MPC · JPL
427933	2005 VW_{40}	—	November 4, 2005	Mount Lemmon	Mount Lemmon Survey	(5)	1.3 km	MPC · JPL
427934	2005 VW_{65}	—	November 1, 2005	Mount Lemmon	Mount Lemmon Survey	·	960 m	MPC · JPL
427935	2005 VR_{69}	—	November 1, 2005	Mount Lemmon	Mount Lemmon Survey	(5)	1.0 km	MPC · JPL
427936	2005 VT_{91}	—	November 6, 2005	Mount Lemmon	Mount Lemmon Survey	·	2.4 km	MPC · JPL
427937	2005 VG_{97}	—	November 5, 2005	Kitt Peak	Spacewatch	·	1.3 km	MPC · JPL
427938	2005 VE_{134}	—	November 2, 2005	Apache Point	A. C. Becker	SYL · CYB	3.6 km	MPC · JPL
427939	2005 WG	—	November 19, 2005	Wrightwood	J. W. Young	·	2.0 km	MPC · JPL
427940	2005 WE_{42}	—	October 28, 2005	Kitt Peak	Spacewatch	JUN	780 m	MPC · JPL
427941	2005 WF_{46}	—	November 22, 2005	Catalina	CSS	·	1.2 km	MPC · JPL
427942	2005 WB_{61}	—	November 25, 2005	Kitt Peak	Spacewatch	·	1.7 km	MPC · JPL
427943	2005 WA_{88}	—	November 28, 2005	Mount Lemmon	Mount Lemmon Survey	·	1.1 km	MPC · JPL
427944	2005 WZ_{109}	—	October 27, 2005	Mount Lemmon	Mount Lemmon Survey	T_{j} (2.99) · 3:2	4.5 km	MPC · JPL
427945	2005 WP_{140}	—	November 26, 2005	Mount Lemmon	Mount Lemmon Survey	·	1.8 km	MPC · JPL
427946	2005 WS_{142}	—	November 29, 2005	Mount Lemmon	Mount Lemmon Survey	(5)	1.0 km	MPC · JPL
427947	2005 WQ_{145}	—	November 25, 2005	Kitt Peak	Spacewatch	·	1.3 km	MPC · JPL
427948	2005 WR_{156}	—	November 30, 2005	Kitt Peak	Spacewatch	·	2.6 km	MPC · JPL
427949	2005 WZ_{169}	—	November 30, 2005	Kitt Peak	Spacewatch	·	1.0 km	MPC · JPL
427950	2005 WH_{176}	—	November 30, 2005	Kitt Peak	Spacewatch	·	1.6 km	MPC · JPL
427951	2005 WJ_{183}	—	November 28, 2005	Socorro	LINEAR	·	1.1 km	MPC · JPL
427952	2005 WY_{198}	—	November 25, 2005	Kitt Peak	Spacewatch	3:2	4.1 km	MPC · JPL
427953	2005 XH_{43}	—	December 2, 2005	Kitt Peak	Spacewatch	·	1.7 km	MPC · JPL
427954	2005 XB_{45}	—	December 2, 2005	Kitt Peak	Spacewatch	(5)	1.1 km	MPC · JPL
427955	2005 XO_{49}	—	December 2, 2005	Kitt Peak	Spacewatch	·	1.2 km	MPC · JPL
427956	2005 XS_{50}	—	December 2, 2005	Kitt Peak	Spacewatch	·	1.5 km	MPC · JPL
427957	2005 XV_{54}	—	December 5, 2005	Kitt Peak	Spacewatch	·	970 m	MPC · JPL
427958	2005 XD_{67}	—	November 25, 2005	Kitt Peak	Spacewatch	·	1.3 km	MPC · JPL
427959	2005 XA_{71}	—	December 2, 2005	Kitt Peak	Spacewatch	·	1.4 km	MPC · JPL
427960	2005 YA_{51}	—	December 25, 2005	Mount Lemmon	Mount Lemmon Survey	·	1.7 km	MPC · JPL
427961	2005 YH_{54}	—	December 25, 2005	Kitt Peak	Spacewatch	·	1.6 km	MPC · JPL
427962	2005 YD_{56}	—	November 28, 2005	Kitt Peak	Spacewatch	·	1.6 km	MPC · JPL
427963	2005 YF_{65}	—	December 25, 2005	Kitt Peak	Spacewatch	ADE	2.2 km	MPC · JPL
427964	2005 YY_{66}	—	December 25, 2005	Kitt Peak	Spacewatch	EUN	1.3 km	MPC · JPL
427965	2005 YD_{71}	—	December 8, 2005	Kitt Peak	Spacewatch	·	1.5 km	MPC · JPL
427966	2005 YX_{83}	—	December 24, 2005	Kitt Peak	Spacewatch	·	1.6 km	MPC · JPL
427967	2005 YZ_{85}	—	December 2, 2005	Mount Lemmon	Mount Lemmon Survey	3:2	5.5 km	MPC · JPL
427968	2005 YQ_{105}	—	December 25, 2005	Kitt Peak	Spacewatch	EUN	1.5 km	MPC · JPL
427969	2005 YU_{108}	—	December 25, 2005	Kitt Peak	Spacewatch	·	1.1 km	MPC · JPL
427970	2005 YC_{118}	—	December 25, 2005	Kitt Peak	Spacewatch	·	1.0 km	MPC · JPL
427971	2005 YG_{125}	—	December 26, 2005	Kitt Peak	Spacewatch	·	1.4 km	MPC · JPL
427972	2005 YY_{141}	—	December 28, 2005	Mount Lemmon	Mount Lemmon Survey	·	1.3 km	MPC · JPL
427973	2005 YW_{142}	—	December 28, 2005	Mount Lemmon	Mount Lemmon Survey	·	1.9 km	MPC · JPL
427974	2005 YB_{167}	—	December 27, 2005	Kitt Peak	Spacewatch	JUN	1.1 km	MPC · JPL
427975	2005 YP_{171}	—	December 10, 2005	Catalina	CSS	BRG	1.7 km	MPC · JPL
427976	2005 YZ_{171}	—	December 22, 2005	Catalina	CSS	(1547)	1.6 km	MPC · JPL
427977	2005 YL_{191}	—	December 30, 2005	Kitt Peak	Spacewatch	·	2.1 km	MPC · JPL
427978	2005 YO_{204}	—	December 25, 2005	Mount Lemmon	Mount Lemmon Survey	·	1.6 km	MPC · JPL
427979	2005 YV_{231}	—	December 27, 2005	Mount Lemmon	Mount Lemmon Survey	MAR	1.4 km	MPC · JPL
427980	2005 YQ_{239}	—	December 29, 2005	Kitt Peak	Spacewatch	·	1.4 km	MPC · JPL
427981	2005 YJ_{290}	—	December 30, 2005	Kitt Peak	Spacewatch	·	1.1 km	MPC · JPL
427982	2006 AY_{14}	—	January 5, 2006	Mount Lemmon	Mount Lemmon Survey	·	1.7 km	MPC · JPL
427983	2006 AJ_{21}	—	January 5, 2006	Catalina	CSS	·	1.5 km	MPC · JPL
427984	2006 AU_{26}	—	January 5, 2006	Kitt Peak	Spacewatch	(5)	1.3 km	MPC · JPL
427985	2006 AP_{38}	—	January 7, 2006	Mount Lemmon	Mount Lemmon Survey	·	1.1 km	MPC · JPL
427986	2006 AQ_{51}	—	January 5, 2006	Kitt Peak	Spacewatch	·	1.5 km	MPC · JPL
427987	2006 AG_{52}	—	January 5, 2006	Kitt Peak	Spacewatch	·	1.1 km	MPC · JPL
427988	2006 AJ_{52}	—	December 25, 2005	Kitt Peak	Spacewatch	·	1.4 km	MPC · JPL
427989	2006 AC_{54}	—	January 5, 2006	Kitt Peak	Spacewatch	·	1.6 km	MPC · JPL
427990	2006 AZ_{54}	—	January 5, 2006	Kitt Peak	Spacewatch	·	1.7 km	MPC · JPL
427991	2006 AL_{59}	—	January 4, 2006	Kitt Peak	Spacewatch	·	1.4 km	MPC · JPL
427992	2006 AX_{74}	—	November 5, 2005	Kitt Peak	Spacewatch	·	2.1 km	MPC · JPL
427993	2006 AR_{105}	—	January 7, 2006	Mount Lemmon	Mount Lemmon Survey	·	2.0 km	MPC · JPL
427994	2006 BA_{7}	—	January 20, 2006	Kitt Peak	Spacewatch	·	2.0 km	MPC · JPL
427995	2006 BZ_{14}	—	January 22, 2006	Mount Lemmon	Mount Lemmon Survey	·	1.9 km	MPC · JPL
427996	2006 BF_{24}	—	January 23, 2006	Mount Lemmon	Mount Lemmon Survey	·	1.4 km	MPC · JPL
427997	2006 BD_{27}	—	January 20, 2006	Kitt Peak	Spacewatch	·	1.8 km	MPC · JPL
427998	2006 BL_{32}	—	January 20, 2006	Kitt Peak	Spacewatch	·	1.9 km	MPC · JPL
427999	2006 BB_{36}	—	January 23, 2006	Kitt Peak	Spacewatch	·	2.0 km	MPC · JPL
428000	2006 BC_{38}	—	January 23, 2006	Kitt Peak	Spacewatch	·	1.5 km	MPC · JPL

back to top

== Meaning of names ==
As minor planet discoveries are confirmed, they are given a permanent number by the IAU's Minor Planet Center (MPC), and the discoverers can then submit names for them, following the IAU's naming conventions. The list below concerns those minor planets in the specified number-range that have received names, and explains the meanings of those names.

Official naming citations of newly named small Solar System bodies are approved and published in a bulletin by IAU's Working Group for Small Bodies Nomenclature (WGSBN). Before May 2021, citations were published in MPC's Minor Planet Circulars for many decades. Recent citations can also be found on the JPL Small-Body Database (SBDB). Until his death in 2016, German astronomer Lutz D. Schmadel compiled these citations into the Dictionary of Minor Planet Names (DMP) and regularly updated the collection.

Based on Paul Herget's The Names of the Minor Planets, Schmadel also researched the unclear origin of numerous asteroids, most of which had been named prior to World War II. This article incorporates text from this source, which is in the public domain: SBDB New namings may only be added to this list below after official publication as the preannouncement of names is condemned. The WGSBN publishes a comprehensive guideline for the naming rules of non-cometary small Solar System bodies.

Named minor planet	Provisional	This minor planet was named for...	Ref · Catalog
427496 van de Weg	2002 BF_{32}	Robert (Rob) L. W. van de Weg (born 1945), Dutch amateur astronomer and former board member of the Dutch Comets Association.	JPL · 427496
427695 Johnpazder	2004 FV_{16}	John Pazder (born 1967) of the National Research Council of Canada, who is the team leader of the optics group of the Herzberg Institute of Astrophysics and optical engineer for the Thirty Meter Telescope project	JPL · 427695
