= 8900 AAVSO =

Main-belt asteroid

Discovery
- Discovered by: D. di Cicco
- Discovery site: Sudbury Obs. (817)
- Discovery date: 24 October 1995

Designations
- Named after: AAVSO (American Association of Variable Star Observers)
- Alternative designations: 1995 UD_{2} · 1979 UV; 1987 SX_{16} · 1989 EU_{2}
- Minor planet category: main-belt · (middle) background

Orbital characteristics
- Epoch 4 September 2017 (JD 2458000.5)
- Uncertainty parameter 0
- Observation arc: 37.37 yr (13,651 days)
- Aphelion: 2.9070 AU
- Perihelion: 2.1657 AU
- Semi-major axis: 2.5364 AU
- Eccentricity: 0.1461
- Orbital period (sidereal): 4.04 yr (1,475 days)
- Mean anomaly: 184.05°
- Mean motion: 0° 14^{m} 38.4^{s} / day
- Inclination: 8.7319°
- Longitude of ascending node: 232.25°
- Argument of perihelion: 99.711°

Physical characteristics
- Dimensions: 5.28 km (calculated); 5.792±0.320 km
- Synodic rotation period: 3.8368±0.0005 h
- Geometric albedo: 0.20 (assumed); 0.276±0.038
- Spectral type: S
- Absolute magnitude (H): 13.4 · 13.75 · 13.2 · 13.303±0.004 (R) · 13.84±0.28

8900 AAVSO, provisional designation 1995 UD_{2}, is a stony background asteroid from the central region of the asteroid belt, approximately 5.5 kilometers in diameter. It was discovered by American amateur astronomer Dennis di Cicco at the U.S Sudbury Observatory (817), Massachusetts, on 24 October 1995. The asteroid was named after the American Association of Variable Star Observers (AAVSO).

== Orbit and classification ==
AAVSO is a non-family asteroid from the main belt's background population. It orbits the Sun in the central main-belt at a distance of 2.2–2.9 AU once every 4.04 years (1,475 days). Its orbit has an eccentricity of 0.15 and an inclination of 9° with respect to the ecliptic. The first precovery was obtained at Kleť Observatory in 1979, extending the asteroid's observation arc by 16 years prior to its discovery.

== Naming ==
This minor planet was named after the American Association of Variable Star Observers (AAVSO), an astronomical pro-am organization that promotes the study of variable stars to both amateur and professional astronomers, maintaining the largest database of variable star observations in the world.

AAVSO was founded in 1911 by amateur astronomer William Tyler Olcott (1873–1936), based on a suggestion by Edward Charles Pickering's (1846–1919), after whom the minor planet 784 Pickeringia is named. The official naming citation was published by the Minor Planet Center on 1 May 2003 (M.P.C. 48388).

== Physical characteristics ==
=== Lightcurve ===
In May 2010, a rotational lightcurve of AAVSO was obtained at the Palomar Transient Factory in California. Lightcurve analysis gave a rotation period of 3.8368 hours with a brightness variation of 0.43 in magnitude (U=2).

=== Diameter and albedo ===
According to the NEOWISE mission of NASA's space-based Wide-field Infrared Survey Explorer, AAVSO measures 5.8 kilometers in diameter and its surface has an albedo of 0.28, while the Collaborative Asteroid Lightcurve Link assumes a standard albedo for stony asteroids of 0.20 and calculates a diameter of 5.3 kilometers.
