= 3841 Dicicco =

Main-belt asteroid binary

Discovery
- Discovered by: B. A. Skiff
- Discovery site: Anderson Mesa Stn.
- Discovery date: 4 November 1983

Designations
- Named after: Dennis di Cicco (American astronomer)
- Alternative designations: 1983 VG_{7} · 1973 YM_{2} 1982 KA_{2}
- Minor planet category: main-belt · Flora

Orbital characteristics
- Epoch 4 September 2017 (JD 2458000.5)
- Uncertainty parameter 0
- Observation arc: 43.27 yr (15,806 days)
- Aphelion: 2.6394 AU
- Perihelion: 1.9083 AU
- Semi-major axis: 2.2739 AU
- Eccentricity: 0.1607
- Orbital period (sidereal): 3.43 yr (1,252 days)
- Mean anomaly: 305.68°
- Mean motion: 0° 17^{m} 14.64^{s} / day
- Inclination: 5.2241°
- Longitude of ascending node: 46.079°
- Argument of perihelion: 359.76°
- Known satellites: 1

Physical characteristics
- Dimensions: 4.74±1.11 km 5.10 km (derived); 6.252±0.110 km 6.45±0.31 km
- Synodic rotation period: 3.5949±0.0002 h (Note: Klinglesmith (2014) web: rotation period 3.5949±0.0002 hours with a brightness amplitude of mag, obs. date: 2014-11-26; Quality Code: n.a.. Summary figures for (3841) Dicicco at Collaborative Asteroid Lightcurve Link (CALL). Referenced publication 2014CBET.4033....1K is not a valid abstract at ADS); 3.5950±0.0001 h
- Geometric albedo: 0.24 (assumed); 0.294±0.033; 0.3126±0.0343; 0.38±0.24
- Spectral type: SMASS = S · S
- Absolute magnitude (H): 12.90 · 13.00 · 13.2 · 13.26±0.25 · 13.63±0.04

3841 Dicicco, provisional designation 1983 VG_{7}, is a stony Florian asteroid and synchronous binary system from the inner regions of the asteroid belt, approximately 5 kilometers in diameter. It was discovered on 4 November 1983, by American astronomer Brian Skiff at Lowell's Anderson Mesa Station near Flagstaff, Arizona, in the United States. It was named after American astronomer Dennis di Cicco. Its minor-planet moon was discovered in 2014.

== Orbit and classification ==
Dicicco is member of the Flora family, one of the largest groups of stony asteroids in the inner main-belt. It orbits the Sun at a distance of 1.9–2.6 AU once every 3 years and 5 months (1,252 days). Its orbit has an eccentricity of 0.16 and an inclination of 5° with respect to the ecliptic.

It was first identified as 1973 YM_{2} at Crimea–Nauchnij in 1973, extending the body's observation arc by 10 years prior to its official discovery observation at Anderson Mesa.

== Physical characteristics ==
Dicicco is a stony S-type asteroid in the SMASS classification.

=== Rotation period ===
In December 2014, two rotational lightcurves of Dicicco were obtained from photometric observations by an international collaboration of American and European astronomers. Lightcurve analysis gave a rotation period of 3.5949 and 3.5950 hours with a brightness amplitude of 0.18 and 0.19 magnitude, respectively (U=3/n.a.).

=== Diameter and albedo ===
According to the survey carried out by NASA's Wide-field Infrared Survey Explorer with its subsequent NEOWISE mission, Dicicco measures between 4.74 and 6.45 kilometers in diameter and its surface has an albedo between 0.294 and 0.38. The Collaborative Asteroid Lightcurve Link assumes an albedo of 0.24 — derived from 8 Flora, the family's largest member and namesake – and derives a diameter of 5.10 kilometers using an absolute magnitude of 13.63.

=== Satellite ===
During the photometric observations made in December 2014, it was revealed that Dicicco is a synchronous binary asteroid. Its minor-planet moon measures at least 1.67 kilometers in diameter based on a diameter-ratio of larger than 0.28. Its orbit has an estimated semi-major axis of 12 kilometers, and a derived period of 21.63 and 21.641 hours, respectively.

== Naming ==
This minor planet was named after American amateur astronomer and astrophotographer Dennis di Cicco. The approved naming citation was published by the Minor Planet Center on 10 April 1990 (M.P.C. 16246).
