= 9983 Rickfienberg =

Asteroid

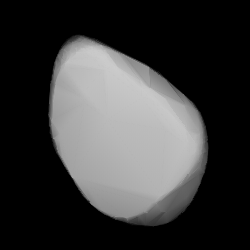
- Rickfienberg modeled from its lightcurve

Discovery
- Discovered by: Dennis di Cicco
- Discovery site: Sudbury Obs. (817)
- Discovery date: 19 February 1995

Designations
- Named after: Richard Fienberg (astronomer, editor)
- Alternative designations: 1995 DA · 1987 KS_{2} 1993 TS_{37}
- Minor planet category: main-belt · (middle)

Orbital characteristics
- Epoch 4 September 2017 (JD 2458000.5)
- Uncertainty parameter 0
- Observation arc: 30.02 yr (10,963 days)
- Aphelion: 3.0191 AU
- Perihelion: 2.3962 AU
- Semi-major axis: 2.7076 AU
- Eccentricity: 0.1150
- Orbital period (sidereal): 4.46 yr (1,627 days)
- Mean anomaly: 107.42°
- Mean motion: 0° 13^{m} 16.32^{s} / day
- Inclination: 8.3223°
- Longitude of ascending node: 49.216°
- Argument of perihelion: 7.2821°

Physical characteristics
- Mean diameter: 7.444±0.280 km 12.18 km (calculated)
- Synodic rotation period: 5.29616±0.00001 h h 5.2963±0.0001 h
- Geometric albedo: 0.057 (assumed); 0.167±0.035
- Spectral type: C (assumed)
- Absolute magnitude (H): 13.2 · 13.3

9983 Rickfienberg (prov. designation: 1995 DA) is a carbonaceous asteroid from the middle region of the asteroid belt, approximately 10 kilometers (6.2 miles) in diameter. It was discovered on 19 February 1995, by American astronomer Dennis di Cicco at his private Sudbury Observatory (817), Massachusetts, United States. It was named after American astronomer and editor Richard Fienberg.

== Orbit and classification ==
Orbit of Rickfienberg (blue), the inner planets and Jupiter (outermost)

Rickfienberg is a non-family asteroid of the main belt's background population when applying the hierarchical clustering method to its proper orbital elements. The dark C-type asteroid orbits the Sun in the central main-belt at a distance of 2.4–3.0 AU once every 4 years and 5 months (1,627 days). Its orbit has an eccentricity of 0.12 and an inclination of 8° with respect to the ecliptic. The first observation was taken at the Australian Siding Spring Observatory in 1987, extending the asteroid's observation arc by 8 years prior to its discovery.

== Naming ==
This minor planet was named for Richard Tresch Fienberg (born 1956) an American astronomer at Rice and Harvard universities, and a stargazer at his private observatory near Danbury, New Hampshire. He is also an editor of the American amateur astronomer magazine Sky & Telescope, after which the minor planet 3243 Skytel is named. The official naming citation was published by the Minor Planet Center on 1 May 2003 (M.P.C. 48389).

== Physical characteristics ==
=== Lightcurve ===
During the asteroid's opposition in November 2011, a rotational lightcurve was obtained from photometric observations at Kitt Peak Observatory. It gave a well-defined rotation period of 5.2963 hours with a high brightness variation of 1.3 in magnitude (U=3), typically indicating a non-spheroidal shape. This period was also confirmed by remodeled data from the Lowell photometric database in March 2016.

=== Diameter and albedo ===
According to the survey carried out by the NEOWISE mission of NASA's Wide-field Infrared Survey Explorer, Rickfienberg measures 7.4 kilometers in diameter and its surface has an albedo of 0.17, while the Collaborative Asteroid Lightcurve Link assumes a standard albedo for carbonaceous asteroids of 0.057 and calculates a diameter of 12.2 kilometers, as the lower the body's albedo (reflectivity), the larger its diameter, at a constant absolute magnitude (brightness).
