= 11132 Horne =

Hygiean asteroid

Discovery
- Discovered by: D. di Cicco
- Discovery site: Sudbury Obs.
- Discovery date: 17 November 1996

Designations
- Named after: Johnny Horne (The Fayetteville Observer)
- Alternative designations: 1996 WU · 1999 JR_{57}
- Minor planet category: main-belt · (outer); Hygiea

Orbital characteristics
- Epoch 23 March 2018 (JD 2458200.5)
- Uncertainty parameter 0
- Observation arc: 24.61 yr (8,989 days)
- Aphelion: 3.4970 AU
- Perihelion: 2.7882 AU
- Semi-major axis: 3.1426 AU
- Eccentricity: 0.1128
- Orbital period (sidereal): 5.57 yr (2,035 days)
- Mean anomaly: 194.38°
- Mean motion: 0° 10^{m} 36.84^{s} / day
- Inclination: 4.2036°
- Longitude of ascending node: 236.87°
- Argument of perihelion: 296.97°

Physical characteristics
- Mean diameter: 12.843±0.302 km
- Geometric albedo: 0.098±0.013
- Absolute magnitude (H): 12.7

11132 Horne (provisional designation 1996 WU) is a Hygiean asteroid from the outer regions of the asteroid belt, approximately 13 kilometers (8 miles) in diameter. It was discovered on 17 November 1996, by American amateur astronomer Dennis di Cicco at his Sudbury Observatory (817) in Massachusetts, United States. The asteroid was named for Johnny Horne, photo editor of The Fayetteville Observer.

== Orbit and classification ==
Horne is a member of the Hygiea family (601), a very large family of carbonaceous outer-belt asteroids, named after the fourth-largest asteroid, 10 Hygiea.

It orbits the Sun in the outer asteroid belt at a distance of 2.8–3.5 AU once every 5 years and 7 months (2,035 days; semi-major axis of 3.14 AU). Its orbit has an eccentricity of 0.11 and an inclination of 4° with respect to the ecliptic. The body's observation arc begins with its first observation at Siding Spring Observatory in April 1993, more than 3 years prior to its official discovery observation.

== Physical characteristics ==
According to the survey carried out by the NEOWISE mission of NASA's Wide-field Infrared Survey Explorer, Horne measures 12.843 kilometers in diameter and its surface has an albedo of 0.098. As of 2018, no rotational lightcurve of Horne has been obtained from photometric observations. The asteroid's rotation period, poles and shape remain unknown.

== Naming ==
This minor planet was named in honor of Johnny Horne (born 1953), photo editor for The Fayetteville Observer, a 75,000 circulation daily newspaper in southeastern North Carolina where Horne has worked for three decades. Horne has been an amateur astronomer since age 10. Since 1989, he has written a monthly astronomy column, Backyard Universe, for The Observer. The official naming citation was published by the Minor Planet Center on 7 January 2004 (M.P.C. 50462).

Horne is also a contributing editor for Sky & Telescope magazine and has served as a study leader for the publication's astronomical expeditions to Mexico, Africa, the Caribbean and Iceland. He photographed Halley's Comet from the Australian Outback in 1986 and his astronomical photographs have appeared in magazines and newspapers worldwide. He regularly reviews amateur astronomy products for Sky and Telescope's test reports. During 2002, Horne produced a collection of his astronomical photographs over 25 years. That Backyard Universe Gallery collection was displayed at the Morehead Planetarium and Science Center in Chapel Hill, North Carolina, 40 years after a class visit there had triggered Horne's lifelong interest in astronomy.
