= Dennis di Cicco =

American astronomer

Minor planets discovered: 60
see § List of discovered minor planets

Dennis di Cicco (/diːˈtʃiːkoʊ/, born 1950) is an American amateur astronomer and a discoverer of minor planets, who lives in New England.

He has discovered 60 numbered asteroids from his backyard observatory in Sudbury, Massachusetts (IAU code: 817). He was a member of the editorial staff of Sky and Telescope magazine from 1974 until his resignation as senior editor in June 2014. His special interests include astronomical photography and the history of astronomical photography, telescope making, and astronomical observing. During 1978 and 1979 he was the first person to successfully photograph the analemma, making 48 separate exposures on a single piece of film during a 12-month period. The project is described in the June 1979 issue of Sky & Telescope. The asteroid 3841 Dicicco was named after him.

Di Cicco conducted observations and calculations to determine the exact time and date of Ansel Adams’ famous 1941 photograph, Moonrise, Hernandez, New Mexico.

He grew up in Hanover, Massachusetts.

== List of discovered minor planets ==
7311 Hildehan	October 14, 1995
7610 Sudbury	December 3, 1995
8900 AAVSO	October 24, 1995
9983 Rickfienberg	February 19, 1995
10153 Goldman	October 26, 1994
10373 MacRobert	March 14, 1996
10596 Stevensimpson	October 4, 1996
11132 Horne	November 17, 1996
12780 Salamony	February 9, 1995
(13183) 1996 TW	October 5, 1996
(13623) 1995 TD	October 3, 1995
(16779) 1996 WH_{2}	November 30, 1996
(17610) 1995 UJ_{1}	October 23, 1995
(19311) 1996 VF_{3}	November 12, 1996
(19323) 1996 XM_{13}	December 9, 1996
(20153) 1996 TC_{8}	October 12, 1996
(20165) 1996 VT_{2}	November 10, 1996
(23565) 1994 WB	November 23, 1994
(27858) 1995 BZ_{1}	January 30, 1995
(27880) 1996 EQ	March 14, 1996
27899 Letterman	August 18, 1996
(27906) 1996 TZ_{7}	October 12, 1996
(27924) 1997 AZ_{10}	January 9, 1997
(30994) 1995 UE_{2}	October 24, 1995
(31006) 1995 XC	December 3, 1995

(31058) 1996 TA_{5}	October 8, 1996
(31081) 1996 XO_{13}	December 9, 1996
(31184) 1997 YZ_{4}	December 26, 1997
(32947) 1995 YH_{2}	December 23, 1995
(39718) 1996 VG_{3}	November 12, 1996
(39728) 1996 WG	November 17, 1996
(39747) 1997 BM_{1}	January 29, 1997
(42543) 1996 BR	January 16, 1996
(42556) 1996 TA_{8}	October 12, 1996
(43894) 1995 TP	October 12, 1995
(43934) 1996 TC	October 1, 1996
(48642) 1995 UH_{1}	October 23, 1995
(48684) 1996 EP	March 14, 1996
(52478) 1995 TO	October 12, 1995
(52531) 1996 TB_{8}	October 12, 1996
(55831) 1995 XL	December 12, 1995
(55847) 1996 SQ	September 20, 1996
(58501) 1996 VQ_{2}	November 10, 1996
(58502) 1996 VH_{3}	November 12, 1996
(58503) 1996 VJ_{3}	November 12, 1996
(73856) 1996 WF	November 16, 1996
(79305) 1995 XK	December 12, 1995
(79331) 1996 TY	October 5, 1996
(79334) 1996 TZ_{9}	October 15, 1996
(100487) 1996 VO_{2}	November 10, 1996

(100495) 1996 WH	November 17, 1996
(100496) 1996 WJ	November 17, 1996
(120651) 1996 TA_{10}	October 15, 1996
(120661) 1996 VZ_{2}	November 11, 1996
(134389) 1996 VP_{2}	November 10, 1996
(162052) 1996 TB_{10}	October 15, 1996
(181761) 1996 VR_{2}	November 10, 1996
(229927) 1996 TN_{9}	October 13, 1996
(243577) 1996 WE	November 16, 1996
(427396) 1996 TA	October 1, 1996

== See also ==
- Moonrise, Hernandez, New Mexico
