= Emanuelli =

Emanuelli may refer to:

- Enrico Emanuelli (1909-1967), Italian novelist, essayist and journalist
- Domingo Emanuelli, Puerto Rican lawyer and politician
- Paul Emanuelli (born 1984), Welsh rugby league footballer
- 1145 Emanuelli, a minor planet named after Pio Emanuelli (1888–1946), an Italian astronomer at the Vatican Observatory
