= Kempowski =

Kempowski may refer to:

- Walter Kempowski (1929–2007), a German author
  - 11789 Kempowski, a minor planet named after the author
