= Meanings of minor-planet names: 11001–12000 =

As minor planet discoveries are confirmed, they are given a permanent number by the IAU's Minor Planet Center (MPC), and the discoverers can then submit names for them, following the IAU's naming conventions. The list below concerns those minor planets in the specified number-range that have received names, and explains the meanings of those names.

Official naming citations of newly named small Solar System bodies are approved and published in a bulletin by IAU's Working Group for Small Bodies Nomenclature (WGSBN). Before May 2021, citations were published in MPC's Minor Planet Circulars for many decades. Recent citations can also be found on the JPL Small-Body Database (SBDB). Until his death in 2016, German astronomer Lutz D. Schmadel compiled these citations into the Dictionary of Minor Planet Names (DMP) and regularly updated the collection.

Based on Paul Herget's The Names of the Minor Planets, Schmadel also researched the unclear origin of numerous asteroids, most of which had been named prior to World War II. This article incorporates text from this source, which is in the public domain: SBDB New namings may only be added to this list below after official publication as the preannouncement of names is condemned. The WGSBN publishes a comprehensive guideline for the naming rules of non-cometary small Solar System bodies.

== 11001–11100 ==
Named minor planet	Provisional	This minor planet was named for...	Ref; Catalog
11001 Andrewulff	1979 MF	André Wulff (born 1958), German amateur astronomer †	MPC · 11001
11002 Richardlis	1979 MD_{1}	Richard J. Lis, M.D. (born 1951), an orthopedist and surgeon with the Orthopedic Institute of Pasadena for over 15 years.	JPL · 11002
11003 Andronov	1979 TT_{2}	Ivan Leonidovich Andronov (born 1960), professor at Odessa National University, is a prominent Ukrainian stellar astrophysicist known for his research on double and symbiotic stars.	JPL · 11003
11004 Stenmark	1980 FJ_{1}	Lars Stenmark (born 1944), a Swedish nanotechnology specialist	MPC · 11004
11005 Waldtrudering	1980 PP_{1}	Waldtrudering, a residential area in Trudering-Riem, borough of Munich, Germany, home of Danish discoverer Richard Martin West	JPL · 11005
11006 Gilson	1980 TZ_{3}	Jewett Castello Gilson (1844–1926), Californian teacher, author and superintendent of schools.	JPL · 11006
11007 Granahan	1980 VA_{3}	James C. Granahan (born 1965) is a scientist at Leidos Inc. whose research includes spectroscopic analysis of asteroids Gaspra and Ida using data from the Galileo spacecraft mission.	JPL · 11007
11008 Ernst	1981 EO_{7}	Carolyn M. Ernst (born 1979) is a planetary scientist at the Johns Hopkins University Applied Physics Laboratory specializing in impact physics of asteroids and other solar system objects.	JPL · 11008
11009 Sigridclose	1981 ET_{10}	Sigrid Close (born 1971) is a professor at Stanford University whose research includes meteoroid plasma detection using radar and space weather measurements using spacecraft.	JPL · 11009
11010 Artemieva	1981 ET_{24}	Natalia A. Artemieva (born 1959) is a Russian planetary scientist known for her theoretical work on impacts of interplanetary bodies into planets and planetary satellites.	JPL · 11010
11011 KIAM	1981 UK_{11}	KIAM is the English abbreviation for the Keldysh Institute of Applied Mathematics of the Russian Academy of Sciences.	JPL · 11011
11012 Henning	1982 JH_{2}	John Henning (born 1947) assisted with the control software development during the conversion of the Palomar 1.2-m Oschin telescope.	JPL · 11012
11013 Kullander	1982 QP_{1}	Sven Kullander (1936–2014), Swedish physicist	MPC · 11013
11014 Svätopluk	1982 QY_{1}	Svätopluk (d. 894) was a king of the ancient Slavs and prince of Great Moravia from 871 to 894.	JPL · 11014
11015 Romanenko	1982 SJ_{7}	Boris Ivanovich Romanenko (born 1912) is a veteran of the group studying jet propulsion in Moscow in the 1930s.	JPL · 11015
11016 Borisov	1982 SG_{12}	Vladimir Aleksandrovich Borisov (1809–1862), regional ethnographer in the town of Shuya and a member of Russian Geography Society.	JPL · 11016
11017 Billputnam	1983 BD	William L. Putnam (1924–2014), the Trustee of the Lowell Observatory.	JPL · 11017
11019 Hansrott	1984 HR	Hans Rott (1858–1884), Austrian composer and organist	MPC · 11019
11020 Orwell	1984 OG	George Orwell (1903–1950), a British writer best known for his novels Animal Farm and Nineteen Eighty-Four	MPC · 11020
11021 Foderà	1986 AT_{2}	Giorgia Foderà (born 1942) teaches history of astronomy at Palermo University. Curator of the Palermo Observatory museum.	JPL · 11021
11022 Serio	1986 EJ_{1}	Salvatore Serio (born 1941) teaches astronomy at Palermo University, specializing in x-ray observations and modeling of solar and stellar coronae.	JPL · 11022
11026 Greatbotkin	1986 RE_{1}	Botkin Hospital in Moscow.	IAU · 11026
11027 Astafʹev	1986 RX_{5}	Victor Petrovich Astafʹev (1924–2001), a prominent Russian writer.	JPL · 11027
11033 Mazanek	1988 SH_{3}	Dan Mazanek (born 1966) is a space systems engineer at NASA Langley Research Center specializing in the development of asteroid mission concepts.	JPL · 11033
11037 Distler	1989 CD_{6}	Hugo Distler (1908–1942), a composer, organist and director of renowned choirs.	JPL · 11037
11039 Raynal	1989 GH_{2}	Guillaume-Thomas Raynal (1713–1796)	JPL · 11039
11040 Wundt	1989 RG_{1}	Wilhelm Wundt (1832–1920), German physiologist and psychologist	JPL · 11040
11041 Fechner	1989 SH_{2}	Gustav Fechner (1801–1887), German experimental psychologist	JPL · 11041
11042 Ernstweber	1989 VD_{1}	Ernst Heinrich Weber (1795–1878), German physiologist and anatomist	JPL · 11042
11043 Pepping	1989 YX_{6}	Ernst Pepping (1901–1981), German composer	JPL · 11043
11050 Messiaën	1990 TE_{7}	Olivier Messiaen (1908–1992), a French organist at Ste. Trinité in Paris.	JPL · 11050
11051 Racine	1990 VH_{12}	Jean-Baptiste Racine (1639–1699), a dramatic poet.	JPL · 11051
11055 Honduras	1991 GT_{2}	Honduras, in the northern part of the Central American isthmus.	JPL · 11055
11056 Volland	1991 LE_{2}	Sophie Volland (1720–1784)	JPL · 11056
11059 Nulliusinverba	1991 RS	"Nullius in verba", variously translated as "On the words of no one", "Nothing in words" or "Respect the facts", is the motto of The Royal Society of London for the Improvement of Natural Knowledge. This minor planet is being named on the occasion of the 350th anniversary of the founding of The Royal Society in 1660.	JPL · 11059
11061 Lagerlöf	1991 RS_{40}	Selma Lagerlöf (1858–1940), a Swedish author.	JPL · 11061
11063 Poynting	1991 VC_{6}	John Henry Poynting (1852–1914), an English physicist.	JPL · 11063
11064 Dogen	1991 WB	The Japanese priest Dogen Zenji (1200–1253)	JPL · 11064
11066 Sigurd	1992 CC_{1}	Sigurd	JPL · 11066
11067 Greenancy	1992 DC_{3}	Nancy Green (born 1952)	JPL · 11067
11069 Bellqvist	1992 EV_{4}	Sven Bellqvist (1915–2008) was for many years in charge of the workshop at the astronomical observatory in Uppsala. During this time the Schmidt telescopes at Kvistaberg and at Mount Stromlo Observatory were built	JPL · 11069
11072 Hiraoka	1992 GP	Hiroyuki Hiraoka (born 1957), an elementary-school teacher and amateur astronomer, active in the Hiroshima Astronomical Society.	JPL · 11072
11073 Cavell	1992 RA_{4}	Edith Cavell (1865–1915)	JPL · 11073
11074 Kuniwake	1992 SC_{1}	Ryoku Kuniwake (born 1957), a longtime member of the Hiroshima Astronomical Society.	JPL · 11074
11075 Dönhoff	1992 SP_{26}	Countess Marion Dönhoff (1909–2002), German journalist and Hitler resistance participant	MPC · 11075
11079 Mitsunori	1993 AJ	Mitsunori Kaneko (born 1957) is an elementary-school teacher and was secretary of the Fukuoka Astronomical Society from 1981 to 1989.	JPL · 11079
11081 Persäve	1993 FA_{13}	Per Arvid Säve (1811–1887) was a teacher in Visby who dedicated most of his spare time to research on the dialects and folklore of Gotland. He also founded a museum in Visby, Fornsalen	JPL · 11081
11082 Spilliaert	1993 JW	Léon Spilliaert (1881–1946), a Belgian symbolist painter and graphic artist	JPL · 11082
11083 Caracas	1993 RZ_{6}	Caracas, Venezuela	JPL · 11083
11084 Giò	1993 SG_{3}	Giuseppe Schilirò (1991–2000), an Italian student	MPC · 11084
11085 Isala	1993 SS_{6}	Isala Van Diest (1842–1916)	JPL · 11085
11086 Nagatayuji	1993 TC_{1}	Yuji Nagata (born 1953), former director of the Fukuoka Astronomical Society.	JPL · 11086
11087 Yamasakimakoto	1993 TK_{1}	Makoto Yamasaki (born 1953), director of the Fukuoka Astronomical Society from 1977 to 1982.	JPL · 11087
11090 Popelin	1994 CT_{12}	Marie Popelin (1846–1913), a Belgian feminist, who became the first Belgian woman to receive a doctorate in law	JPL · 11090
11091 Thelonious	1994 DP	Thelonious Monk (1917–1982), American jazz pianist and composer	JPL · 11091
11092 Iwakisan	1994 ED	Mount Iwaki	JPL · 11092
11094 Cuba	1994 PG_{17}	Cuba is an island state in the Caribbean Sea, consisting of one large island and numerous smaller islands, islets and cays.	JPL · 11094
11095 Havana	1994 PJ_{22}	Havana, Cuba	JPL · 11095
11098 Ginsberg	1995 GC_{2}	Allen Ginsberg (1926–1997), an American lyric poet and teacher.	JPL · 11098
11099 Sonodamasaki	1995 HL	Masaki Sonoda (born 1954), an associate president of the Saga Astronomical Society since 1989.	JPL · 11099
11100 Lai	1995 KC	Luciano Lai (born 1948), Italian observer and discoverer of minor planets at Madonna di Dossobuono Observatory, Italy.	JPL · 11100

== 11101–11200 ==
back to top

Named minor planet	Provisional	This minor planet was named for...	Ref; Catalog
11101 Českáfilharmonie	1995 SH	Czech Philharmonic Orchestra.	JPL · 11101
11102 Bertorighini	1995 SZ_{4}	Alberto Righini (born 1942), a professor of astronomy at the University of Florence and Arcetri Observatory	MPC · 11102
11103 Miekerouppe	1995 SX_{19}	Mieke Rouppe, member of the Dutch resistance in The Hague in World War II †	MPC · 11103
11104 Airion	1995 TQ	Evelyn Airion Enyart (born 1952) teaches seminars in healing techniques. She was born in Louisiana, raised in Guatemala and educated at the University of New Mexico, receiving degrees in both Communications and Sign Language. She presents workshops around the world, writes books and produces videos on healing techniques.	JPL · 11104
11105 Puchnarová	1995 UR_{2}	Dana Puchnarová (1938–2025), Czech painter and graphic artist	MPC · 11105
11107 Hakkoda	1995 UU_{4}	Hakkōda Mountains a Japanese mountain range in northernmost Honshu.	JPL · 11107
11108 Hachimantai	1995 UJ_{6}	Hachimantai is a beautiful highland. Some 1600 m high, it forms a part of the Ohu-Mountains located in northern Honshu. It is named as one of the 100 most celebrated mountains of Japan.	JPL · 11108
11109 Iwatesan	1995 UG_{8}	Mount Iwate (Iwate-san) is a Japanese volcano with a peak of 2041 m that erupted a few years ago. It is located on the east of Mount Hachimantai.	JPL · 11109
11111 Repunit	1995 WL	A repunit ("repeated unity") is a number consisting solely of the digit 1. The term was coined by Albert H. Beiler in his 1964 book Recreations in the Theory of Numbers	JPL · 11111
11112 Cagnoli	1995 WM_{2}	Antonio Cagnoli (1743–1816) an Italian astronomer, who helped establish the Società Italiana ("Italian Society"), a.k.a. the Società dei XL ("Society of the Forty"), ancestor of the Accademia Nazionale delle Scienze detta dei XL ("National Academy of Sciences known as the Forty")	JPL · 11112
11115 Kariya	1995 WC_{7}	Kariya City, located in the center of Aichi Prefecture, Japan. The discoverer, Akimasa Nakamura, had lived there for some time.	JPL · 11115
11117 Giuseppeolongo	1996 LP_{1}	Giuseppe O. Longo (born 1941) an Italian mathematician and engineer at the University of Trieste. He is also the scientific manager of the astronomical society (Circolo Culturale Astronomico di Farra d'Isonzo) at the Farra d'Isonzo Observatory (Src).	IAU · 11117
11118 Modra	1996 PK	Astronomické observatórium Modra-Piesok (Astronomical Observatory of Modra-Piesok), near Modra, Slovakia †	MPC · 11118
11119 Taro	1996 PS_{9}	Soutaro Ito (born 1925) has contributed much to the popularization of astronomy and established the Nanyo Astronomical Lovers Club in 1983. He was central to the establishment in 1986 of the society's observatory, the Nanyo Civil Astronomical Observatory.	JPL · 11119
11120 Pancaldi	1996 QD_{1}	Enelio Pancaldi (born 1947), an Italian amateur astronomer.	JPL · 11120
11121 Malpighi	1996 RD_{1}	Marcello Malpighi (1628–1694) holds a prominent position in the history of medicine and biology, working in Pisa, Bologna, Messina and Rome. A pioneer in the use of the microscope in anatomy, he made fundamental studies of the lungs. He later made contributions in hematology and embryology.	JPL · 11121
11122 Eliscolombini	1996 RQ_{2}	Elis Colombini (born 1957) is the editor of publications on the local history of his birthplace of Modena and the surrounding province.	JPL · 11122
11123 Aliciaclaire	1996 RT_{24}	Alicia Claire Contrite (born 1966) is an extraordinarily devoted mother, wife and daughter. She is a prosecuting attorney for the city of Santa Monica, California, primarily concerned with the plight of abused women. The citation was prepared by M. Hibbs, Alicia's mother, at the request of E. Helin of the NEAT team.	JPL · 11123
11124 Mikulášek	1996 TR_{9}	Zdeněk Mikulášek (born 1947), Czech astronomer and director of the Nicholas Copernicus Observatory and Planetarium in Brno	MPC · 11124
11126 Doleček	1996 TC_{15}	Josef ("Jožka") Doleček (born 1912) had a principal role in building the public observatory of Valašské Meziříčí and was its first director. His work gave a basis for the observatory's success in astronomy popularization in the Czech Republic.	JPL · 11126
11127 Hagi	1996 UH_{1}	The name Hagi-Lespedeza is derived from the flower in the symbol of Sendai City, Japan.	JPL · 11127
11128 Ostravia	1996 VP	Latin name for Ostrava, Czech Republic	MPC · 11128
11129 Hayachine	1996 VS_{5}	Mount Hayachine is located in the Kitakami highlands of Japan	JPL · 11129
11132 Horne	1996 WU	Johnny Horne (born 1953), an American amateur astronomer since age 10 from North Carolina	JPL · 11132
11133 Kumotori	1996 XY	Mount Kumotori, the highest peak in the Tokyo Metropolis, Japan	JPL · 11133
11134 České Budějovice	1996 XO_{2}	České Budějovice, a city in the Czech Republic	MPC · 11134
11135 Ryokami	1996 XF_{3}	Mount Ryōkami is located at the northern part of the Kanto plain. It is known for its exceptionally unique shape that looks like the blade of a saw. The stunning landscape it outlines in the Kanto mountains makes it one of the 100 most celebrated mountains of Japan.	JPL · 11135
11136 Shirleymarinus	1996 XW_{12}	Shirley Marinus (born 1921) served during a third of a century as secretary in the Lunar and Planetary Laboratory for the Polariscope program, the Imaging Photopolarimeters on Pioneers 10 and 11, the Space Science Series textbooks, and the Spacewatch survey of comets and minor planets.	JPL · 11136
11137 Yarigatake	1996 XE_{19}	Mount Yari (Yari-ga-take) has a characteristic pear-shaped peak. A difficult and challenging 3180-meter climb, it is one of the 100 most celebrated mountains in Japan.	JPL · 11137
11138 Hotakadake	1996 XC_{31}	Mount Hotakadake is the generic name of several mountain peaks, some of them more than 3000 meters high, in central Japan.	JPL · 11138
11139 Qingdaoligong	1996 YF_{2}	Qingdao University of Technology.	JPL · 11139
11140 Yakedake	1997 AP_{1}	Mount Yake volcano, Japan	JPL · 11140
11141 Jindrawalter	1997 AX_{14}	Jindřich Walter (born 1941), Czech physicist	MPC · 11141
11142 Facchini	1997 AP_{17}	Renato Facchini (born 1917), a well-known Italian amateur astronomer.	JPL · 11142
11144 Radiocommunicata	1997 CR_{1}	Radio communication, in honour of the Kleť broadcasting tower staff	MPC · 11144
11145 Emanuelli	1997 QH_{1}	Pio Emanuelli (1888–1946), an Italian astronomer at the Vatican Observatory and teaching astronomy and history of astronomy at Rome University Img	MPC · 11145
11146 Kirigamine	1997 WD_{3}	Mount Kirigamine, one of the 100 Famous Japanese Mountains	JPL · 11146
11147 Delmas	1997 XT_{5}	Robert Delmas (born 1955), a French aeronautical engineer.	JPL · 11147
11148 Einhardress	1997 XO_{8}	Einhard Ress (born 1936), an engineer and scientist at the German Aerospace Center (DLR).	JPL · 11148
11149 Tateshina	1997 XZ_{9}	Mount Tateshina volcano, one of the 100 Famous Japanese Mountains	JPL · 11149
11150 Bragg	1997 YG_{1}	Sir William Henry Bragg (1862−1942), British physicist, chemist and mathematician, who received the Nobel prize in physics in 1915.	JPL · 11150
11151 Oodaigahara	1997 YZ_{2}	Mount Ōdaigahara, one of the "100 Famous Japanese Mountains", in the National Park of Yoshino-Kumano and a UNESCO World Heritage Site	JPL · 11151
11152 Oomine	1997 YH_{5}	Mount Ōmine, in the middle of the Kii peninsula, in the National Park of Yoshino-Kumano, one of the 100 Famous Japanese Mountains, a UNESCO World Heritage Site	JPL · 11152
11154 Kobushi	1997 YD_{10}	Mount Kobushi, one of the 100 Famous Japanese Mountains, in the Oku-Chichibu area, stretching over the three states of Kōshū, Bushu, and Shinshu	JPL · 11154
11155 Kinpu	1997 YW_{13}	Mount Kinpu, one of the 100 Famous Japanese Mountains, in the Oku-Chichibu area	JPL · 11155
11156 Al-Khwarismi	1997 YP_{14}	Muhammad ibn Musa Al-Khwarismi (fl. c. 825) was an Arab mathematician and astronomer whose books, translated into Latin, were the main source through which Indian numerals and Arabic algebra came into Western Europe.	JPL · 11156
11158 Cirou	1998 AJ_{6}	Alain Cirou (born 1958) is editor of Ciel et Espace magazine.	JPL · 11158
11159 Mizugaki	1998 BH_{1}	Mount Mizugaki is located at the western end of the Oku-Chichibu mountain chain. It has a particularly strange appearance, composed of large, humped rocks.	JPL · 11159
11160 Wechsler	1998 BH_{7}	Robert Wechsler, American artist.	IAU · 11160
11161 Daibosatsu	1998 BA_{8}	Daibosatu mountain, which has a 2057-m peak, is located on the northern end of the Koganesawa mountain chain in Japan	JPL · 11161
11163 Milešovka	1998 CR	Milešovka, the highest mountain in the Bohemian Highlands (Czech České středohoří), on the occasion of 100 years of observations from the meteorological observatory there	JPL · 11163
11165 Mariocabrera	1998 DE_{5}	Mario Cabrera, American focal-plane engineer.	IAU · 11165
11166 Anatolefrance	1998 DF_{34}	Anatole France (1844–1924), French writer	MPC · 11166
11167 Kunžak	1998 FD_{3}	Kunžak is a picturesque village in South Bohemia, Czech Republic	JPL · 11167
11169 Alkon	1998 FW_{33}	Andy L. Alkon (born 1986), an ISEF awardee in 2002	JPL · 11169
11170 Bradenmilford	1998 FY_{34}	Braden Nicholas Milford (b. 2001), a finalist in the 2019 Regeneron Science Talent Search, a science competition for high school seniors, for his environmental science project. He attended the Cascia Hall Preparatory School, Tulsa, Oklahoma.	IAU · 11170
11173 Jayanderson	1998 FA_{59}	Jay S. Anderson (born 1985), an ISEF awardee in 2002	JPL · 11173
11174 Carandrews	1998 FR_{67}	Carolyn Marie Andrews (born 1984), an ISEF awardee in 2002	JPL · 11174
11176 Batth	1998 FD_{68}	Sukhjeet Singh Batth (born 1985), an ISEF awardee in 2002	JPL · 11176
11178 Emmajoy	1998 FR_{101}	Emma Joy Montgomery (b. 2001) was a finalist in the 2019 Regeneron Science Talent Search, a science competition for high school seniors, for her bioengineering project. She attended the Ossining High School, Ossining, New York.	IAU · 11178
11179 Ahmadperez	1998 FB_{109}	Ahmad Amin Perez (b. 2001) was a finalist in the 2019 Regeneron Science Talent Search, a science competition for high school seniors, for his environmental science project. He attended the Brentwood High School - Sonderling Center, Brentwood, New York.	IAU · 11179
11180 Brentperlman	1998 FU_{117}	Brent Perlman (b. 2001) was a finalist in the 2019 Regeneron Science Talent Search, a science competition for high school seniors, for his bioengineering project. He attended the Byram Hills High School, Armonk, New York.	IAU · 11180
11184 Postma	1998 HJ_{9}	Sep Postma (1921–1944), member of the Dutch resistance in World War II †	MPC · 11184
11187 Richoliver	1998 KO_{4}	Richard C. Oliver (born 1948), an electronics specialist at the Lowell Observatory.	JPL · 11187
11189 Rabeaton	1998 QQ_{43}	Rachael Lynn Beaton (born 1985), an ISEF awardee in 2002	JPL · 11189
11190 Jennibell	1998 RM_{52}	Jennifer Marie Bell (born 1984), an ISEF awardee in 2002	JPL · 11190
11191 Paskvić	1998 XW_{16}	Ivan Paskvić (1754–1829), Croatian founder and director of the Buda Observatory	JPL · 11191
11193 Mérida	1998 XN_{96}	Mérida, a Venezuelan city, named in 1558 by Juan Rodriguez Suarez, is also known as "the city of the gentlemen" for its hospitality; "the city of the snowing mountains" for the surrounding Andes; and "the university city" for its famous Universidad de Los Andes.	MPC · 11193
11194 Mirna	1998 YE	Mirna river, Croatia	JPL · 11194
11195 Woomera	1999 AY_{22}	Woomera, Aboriginal for spear thrower, is a village in the Australian outback founded in 1947 as a rocket rangehead.	JPL · 11195
11196 Michanikos	1999 BO_{9}	Heron of Alexandria, also known as "Michanikos, the machine man" (c. 10–75), invented many automatic contrivances long before the age of the computer.	JPL · 11196
11197 Beranek	1999 CY_{25}	Benjamin Charles Beranek (born 1984), an ISEF awardee in 2002	JPL · 11197

== 11201–11300 ==
back to top

Named minor planet	Provisional	This minor planet was named for...	Ref; Catalog
11201 Talich	1999 EL_{5}	Václav Talich (1883–1961), a well-known Czech conductor.	JPL · 11201
11202 Teddunham	1999 FA_{10}	Edward W. Dunham (born 1952), an astronomer at the Lowell Observatory.	JPL · 11202
11203 Danielbetten	1999 FV_{26}	Daniel Price Betten (born 1987), an ISEF awardee in 2002	JPL · 11203
11206 Bibee	1999 FR_{29}	Kristin Page Bibee (born 1984), an ISEF awardee in 2002	JPL · 11206
11207 Black	1999 FQ_{58}	Maribeth Joanne Black (born 1984), an ISEF awardee in 2002	JPL · 11207
11210 Kevinqian	1999 GP_{22}	Kevin Chengming Qian (b. 2000), a finalist in the 2019 Regeneron Science Talent Search, a science competition for high school seniors, for his physics project. He attended the Montgomery Blair High School, Silver Spring, Maryland.	IAU · 11210
11211 Saxena	1999 GD_{24}	Eshika Saxena (b. 2001), a finalist in the 2019 Regeneron Science Talent Search, a science competition for high school seniors, for her computer science project. She attended the Interlake High School, Bellevue, Washington.	IAU · 11211
11212 Tebbutt	1999 HS	John Tebbutt (1834–1916) was an Australian astronomer whose observations included many comets and the 1874 transit of Venus. His name is particularly associated with the great comets of 1861 and 1881. He was the first president of the New South Wales branch of the British Astronomical Association.	JPL · 11212
11214 Ruhisayana	1999 HP_{8}	Ruhi Sayana (b. 2001), a finalist in the 2019 Regeneron Science Talent Search, a science competition for high school seniors, for her medicine and health project. She attended the Harker School, San Jose, California.	IAU · 11214
11216 Billhubbard	1999 JG_{1}	William B. Hubbard (born 1940) is a planetary scientist studying interiors and atmospheres at the Lunar and Planetary Laboratory of the University of Arizona, where he was also director during 1977–1981. His studies include the structure and evolution of Jupiter, Saturn and extrasolar giant planets	JPL · 11216
11219 Benbohn	1999 JN_{20}	Benjamin Josef Bohn (born 1985), an ISEF awardee in 2002	JPL · 11219
11225 Borden	1999 JD_{36}	Timothy Calvin Borden (born 1985), an ISEF awardee in 2002	JPL · 11225
11227 Ksenborisova	1999 JR_{43}	Ksenia V. Borisova (born 1983), an ISEF awardee in 2002	JPL · 11227
11228 Botnick	1999 JW_{49}	Aaron Michael Botnick (born 1984), an ISEF awardee in 2002	JPL · 11228
11229 Brookebowers	1999 JX_{52}	Brooke Nacole Bowers (born 1986), an ISEF awardee in 2002	JPL · 11229
11230 Deschaffer	1999 JV_{57}	Daniel Edwin Schaffer (b. 2001), a finalist in the 2019 Regeneron Science Talent Search, a science competition for high school seniors, for his genomics project. He attended the Montgomery Blair High School, Silver Spring, Maryland.	IAU · 11230
11231 Schiavo	1999 JF_{59}	Justin D. Schiavo (b. 2001), a finalist in the 2019 Regeneron Science Talent Search, a science competition for high school seniors, for his engineering project. He attended the Roslyn High School, Roslyn Heights, New York.	IAU · 11231
11238 Johanmaurits	2044 P-L	Count John Maurice, Prince of Nassau-Siegen (1604–1679), governor of Dutch Brazil (1637–1644), was the founder of the first astronomical observatory and meteorological station by a non-American in the Americas. During his reign he stimulated the arts, science and freedom of religion and created local councils to govern Dutch Brazil.	JPL · 11238
11239 Marcgraf	4141 P-L	Georg Marcgrave (1610–1643), German-Dutch astronomer, mathematician and naturalist, made the first serious study of the southern sky during his stay in Dutch Brazil. He is also known for his zoological and cartographic work during the reign of Johan Maurits in Dutch Brazil. Marcgraf died in 1643 in Luanda (then Dutch Angola).	JPL · 11239
11240 Piso	4175 P-L	Willem Piso (1610–1678), Dutch doctor of medicine, together with Georg Marcgraf wrote the first book about the flora, fauna and the local customs of the Brazilians. Their book was and is a unique example of Brazilian society during the reign of the Dutch in Brazil.	JPL · 11240
11241 Eckhout	6792 P-L	Albert Eckhout (1610–1666), Dutch painter who took part in an expedition to Brazil, made portraits of the people who inhabited Dutch Brazil during the reign of Johan Maurits, count of Nassau-Siegen in the 17th century.	JPL · 11241
11242 Franspost	2144 T-1	Frans Post (1612–1680), a Dutch painter who was one of the first European-trained artists to paint in the Americas. He recorded various aspects of life and the local atmosphere of Dutch Brazil, or Nieuw Holland, in his paintings.	JPL · 11242
11243 de Graauw	2157 T-1	Matthijs W. M. de Graauw (born 1942), a Dutch astronomer who is known for his tireless enthusiasm in pushing Dutch and European infrared and submillimeter astronomy forward, both on the ground and in space.	JPL · 11243
11244 Andrékuipers	4314 T-2	André Kuipers (born 1958), a Dutch medical doctor and ESA astronaut who has had an inspiring role in promoting space among young people.	JPL · 11244
11245 Hansderijk	3100 T-3	Johannes A. F. de Rijk (born 1926) is a gifted Dutch science writer. Better known under the pseudonym Bruno Ernst, he has made contributions to astronomy, mathematics, physics, art and natural science, sundials and the art of M. C. Escher.	JPL · 11245
11246 Orvillewright	4250 T-3	Orville Wright (1871–1948), American aviator, generally credited with the assistance of his brother as being the first pilot of a heavier-than-air flying machine.	JPL · 11246
11247 Wilburwright	4280 T-3	Wilbur Wright (1867–1912), American aviator who participated with his brother in the first successful flights of a heavier-than-air flying machine at Kitty Hawk, North Carolina, on 17 December 1903.	JPL · 11247
11248 Blériot	4354 T-3	Louis Blériot (1872–1936), French aviator and airplane designer, made the first airplane crossing of the English Channel from France to England on 25 July 1909.	JPL · 11248
11249 Etna	1971 FD	Mount Etna is a stratovolcano above the Sicilian city of Catania in Italy. Its height is 3350 meters, and the last eruption was 2003. Etna's eruptions have been known since antiquity.	JPL · 11249
11251 Icarion	1973 SN_{1}	Icarion, from Greek mythology, the son of Ebalus of Sparta. By the nymph Periboea, Icarion was the father of Penelope.	JPL · 11251
11252 Laërtes	1973 SA_{2}	Laërtes, king of Ithaca, was the son of Arcisius, who in turn was a son of Zeus. Laërtes was the husband of Anticleia and father of Odysseus.	JPL · 11252
11253 Mesyats	1976 UP_{2}	Gennadij Andreevich Mesyats (born 1936), a Russian physicist.	JPL · 11253
11254 Konkohekisui	1977 DL_{2}	Konko Hekisui (1909–1989) was a Japanese poet and sometime director of the library in Konko, Okayama prefecture.	JPL · 11254
11255 Fujiiekio	1977 DC_{4}	Fujii Ekio (1910–1990), an amateur astronomer and sometime director of the Okayama Astronomy Museum.	JPL · 11255
11256 Fuglesang	1978 RO_{8}	Christer Fuglesang, the first Swedish astronaut	JPL · 11256
11257 Rodionta	1978 TP_{2}	Tatiana Vladimirovna Rodionova (born 1964) is an engineer in Orenburg, wife of Igor' Victorovich Rodionov, building engineer, and the discoverer's friend.	JPL · 11257
11258 Aoyama	1978 VP_{1}	Aoyama Gakuin, a Christian educational institute founded in 1874, is the discoverer's Alma Mater.	JPL · 11258
11259 Yingtungchen	1978 VD_{3}	Ying-Tung "Charles" Chen (born 1981) is a post-doctoral fellow at the Academia Sinica Institute of Astronomy and Astrophysics (Taiwan) where he uses data from large surveys to study outer solar system objects.	JPL · 11259
11260 Camargo	1978 VD_{9}	Julio Ignacio Bueno de Camargo (born 1967) is a researcher at the Observatorio Nacional (Brazil) who specializes in astrometry of solar system bodies and reference frames, particularly in the prediction and observation of stellar occultations.	JPL · 11260
11261 Krisbecker	1978 XK	Kris Jay Becker (born 1959), a senior computer scientist at the United States Geological Survey Astrogeology Science Center.	JPL · 11261
11262 Drube	1979 MP_{3}	Line Drube (born 1980) is a postdoctoral researcher at the German Aerospace Center (DLR-Berlin) whose investigations include the thermal properties of asteroids and the properties of Martian airborne dust using data from the Phoenix Lander.	JPL · 11262
11263 Pesonen	1979 OA	Lauri Pesonen (born 1944), an emeritus professor of geophysics at the University of Helsinki.	JPL · 11263
11264 Claudiomaccone	1979 UC_{4}	Claudio Maccone (born 1948), Italian scientist at the Alenia Spazio in Turin, participant in the design of several scientific space missions (Src)	MPC · 11264
11265 Hasselmann	1981 EU_{34}	Pedro Henrique Aragão Hasselmann (born 1987) completed his PhD at Observatório Nacional do Rio de Janeiro researching the photometric properties and phase functions of asteroids.	JPL · 11265
11266 Macke	1981 ES_{41}	Robert J. Macke SJ (born 1974) is a research scientist and meteorite curator at the Vatican Observatory, whose fundamental contributions include studying the relationship between shock state and porosity in carbonaceous chondrites.	JPL · 11266
11267 Donaldkessler	1981 UE_{28}	Donald J. Kessler (born 1940), American astrophysicist and founder of the modern field of orbital debris, who was the head of NASA's orbital debris office	JPL · 11267
11268 Spassky	1985 UF_{5}	Igor' Dmitrievich Spassky (born 1926), a specialist on shipbuilding and a great authority on creation of ice-resistant oil-and-gas production platforms and high-speed railway transport. He is an honored citizen of Saint Petersburg.	JPL · 11268
11269 Knyr	1987 QG_{10}	Igor' Ivanovich Knyr (born 1963), an engineer and specialist on the introduction of new techniques in industry and a friend of the discoverer's family.	JPL · 11269
11274 Castillo-Rogez	1988 SX_{2}	Julie Castillo-Rogez (born 1974) is a planetary scientist at the Jet Propulsion Laboratory who has performed extensive thermal and geochemical modeling of Ceres to interpret its interior structure based on Dawn Spacecraft data.	JPL · 11274
11277 Ballard	1988 TW_{2}	Robert Ballard (born 1942), a marine scientist.	JPL · 11277
11278 Telesio	1989 SD_{3}	Bernardino Telesio (1509–1588), an Italian philosopher and natural scientist.	JPL · 11278
11280 Sakurai	1989 TY_{10}	Yukio Sakurai (born 1953), a local government official and an amateur astronomer in Japan.	JPL · 11280
11281 Nobuooshita	1989 UM_{1}	Nobuo Oshita (b. 1951) is a Japanese amateur astronomer living in Hida City, Gifu Prefecture.	IAU · 11281
11282 Hanakusa	1989 UY_{2}	Kiyotaka Hanakusa (born 1956), director of the Seiwa Kogen Observatory since 1995, is an astronomy scholar and popularizer of astronomy in Kumamoto Prefecture.	JPL · 11282
11284 Belenus	1990 BA	Belenus, husband of Belisana, is the Gaulish god of light, with responsibilities also to sheep and cattle.	JPL · 11284
11288 Okunohosomichi	1990 XU	Oku no Hosomichi ("The Narrow Road to the Interior") is a Haikai travel journal written by Matsuo Basho, master Haikai poet, when he traveled the Northern Provinces of Honshu in 1689, accompanied by his apprentice Kawai Sora	JPL · 11288
11289 Frescobaldi	1991 PA_{2}	Girolamo Frescobaldi, Italian composer.	JPL · 11289
11292 Bunjisuzuki	1991 RC_{28}	Bunji Suzuki (born 1955), a high-school teacher and an amateur astrophysicist specializing in comets.	JPL · 11292
11294 Kazu	1992 CK	Kazumasa Imai (born 1955) is a Japanese radio astronomer at Kochi National College of Technology.	JPL · 11294
11295 Gustaflarsson	1992 EU_{28}	Carl Gustaf Larsson (1893–1985), born in Norrlanda, Gotland, was originally a carpenter but started to write poems in the local language spoken on Gotland. He is also well known for his photographs describing daily life on Gotland	JPL · 11295
11296 Denzen	1992 KA	Aōdō Denzen (1748–1822) was a western-style painter of the Edo period born in Sukagawa in Oshu (now Sukagawa city, Fukushima prefecture). He was the first artist in Japan to perfect elaborate western-style copper plate engraving. The name was suggested by H. Sato.	JPL · 11296
11298 Gide	1992 RE_{6}	André Gide (1869–1951), a French writer, humanist and moralist.	JPL · 11298
11299 Annafreud	1992 SA_{22}	Anna Freud (1895–1982), the youngest daughter of Sigmund Freud, escaped with her father in 1938 Austria and settled in London. In 1936 she published Das Ich und die Abwehrmechanismen. She is considered the founder of child psychoanalysis.	JPL · 11299

== 11301–11400 ==
back to top

Named minor planet	Provisional	This minor planet was named for...	Ref; Catalog
11302 Rubicon	1993 BM_{5}	The Rubicon (Latin Rubico) was a small river that separated ancient Cisalpine Gaul from Italy.	JPL · 11302
11304 Cowra	1993 DJ	Cowra in New South Wales, Australia, is a tourist destination.	JPL · 11304
11305 Ahlqvist	1993 FS_{6}	David Ahlqvist (1900–1988) was an artist, author, musician and for many years a leading personality in the cultural life on Gotland	JPL · 11305
11306 Åkesson	1993 FF_{18}	Sonja Åkesson (1926–1977), born in Buttle on Gotland, was well known for her characteristic poetic style describing the struggles of daily life. She was also a songwriter	JPL · 11306
11307 Erikolsson	1993 FA_{40}	Erik Olsson (1919–2007) was an artist who also worked with restoration of churches. He initiated the foundation of a museum in Kovik that reflects the history of fishing on Gotland	JPL · 11307
11308 Tofta	1993 FF_{76}	Tofta is a parish on Gotland with one of the most popular beaches on the island. It is the site of a 47-m stoneship, the longest to be found on Gotland	JPL · 11308
11309 Malus	1993 PC_{7}	Étienne-Louis Malus (1775–1812), a French physicist.	JPL · 11309
11311 Peleus	1993 XN_{2}	Peleus, king of the Myrmidons in Thessaly, helped Heracles conquer Troy. He was married to the goddess Thetis.	JPL · 11311
11313 Kügelgen	1994 GE_{10}	Gerhard von Kügelgen (1772–1820) and his son Wilhelm von Kügelgen (1802–1867), prominent German painters.	JPL · 11313
11314 Charcot	1994 NR_{1}	Jean-Martin Charcot (1825–1893), one of France's greatest medical clinicians.	JPL · 11314
11315 Salpêtrière	1994 NS_{1}	"Salpêtrière Hospital", a famous neurological clinic.	JPL · 11315
11316 Fuchitatsuo	1994 TR_{3}	Tatsuo Fuchi (born 1952), a computer technology specialist and amateur astronomer.	JPL · 11316
11317 Hitoshi	1994 TX_{12}	Hitoshi Hasegawa (born 1957), a computer programmer and an amateur planetary scientist.	JPL · 11317
11321 Tosimatumoto	1995 DE_{1}	Tosikazu Matumoto (born 1941), a comet hunter in Takefu, Fukui prefecture.	JPL · 11321
11322 Aquamarine	1995 QT	Aquamarine is the name of a Japanese duo group, Sachiko (born 1975) and Mimas (born 1971). They sing of stars and the universe. Their COSMOS is the main theme song of the "Star Week" event, produced by the National Astronomical Observatory of Japan.	JPL · 11322
11323 Nasu	1995 QC_{2}	Eiichi Nasu (born 1955) was chief editor of the newsletter Astro Oita of the Astronomical Society of Oita for more than ten years, beginning in 1979. He is now the director of this society.	JPL · 11323
11324 Hayamizu	1995 QQ_{3}	Tsutomu Hayamizu (born 1962), associate director of the Sendai Space Hall and Observatory since 1997.	JPL · 11324
11325 Slavický	1995 SG	Klement Slavický (1910–1999), an outstanding Czech composer.	JPL · 11325
11326 Ladislavschmied	1995 SL	Ladislav Schmied (born 1927), a Czech amateur astronomer, known for his systematic observations of the sun. He has made more than 10,000 plots of the solar photosphere during the last 50 years. The name was suggested by P. Spurný.	JPL · 11326
11328 Mariotozzi	1995 UL	Mario Tozzi, Italian geologist, author, and president of the Arcipelago Toscano National Park	JPL · 11328
11332 Jameswatt	1996 GO_{20}	James Watt, Scottish mathematician and engineer.	JPL · 11332
11333 Forman	1996 HU	Milos Forman (born 1932), a Czech films director. JPL	MPC · 11333
11334 Rio de Janeiro	1996 HM_{18}	Rio de Janeiro, Brazil.	JPL · 11334
11335 Santiago	1996 HW_{23}	Santiago, Chile.	JPL · 11335
11336 Piranesi	1996 NS_{3}	Giambattista Piranesi, 18th-century Venetian architect and etcher, one of the main inspirers of neoclassicism	JPL · 11336
11337 Sandro	1996 PG_{1}	Sandro Bartolini (born 1974), the elder son of the first discoverer.	JPL · 11337
11338 Schiele	1996 TL_{9}	Egon Schiele, Austrian painter	MPC · 11338
11339 Orlík	1996 VM_{5}	Orlík, castle in South Bohemia, Czech Republic	MPC · 11339
11341 Babbage	1996 XE_{2}	Charles Babbage, a British mathematician.	JPL · 11341
11348 Allegra	1997 BG_{9}	Allegra Noccioli (born 1999) is the daughter of Fabrizio Noccioli, an amateur astronomer in the Montelupo Group.	JPL · 11348
11349 Witten	1997 JH_{16}	Edward Witten (born 1951), a physicist at the Institute for Advanced Study in Princeton and one of the premier theoretical physicists of our time.	JPL · 11349
11350 Teresa	1997 QN_{4}	Teresa Chercoles (born 1951), wife of Rafael Pacheco, passes many nights at home while Pacheco and his colleagues are at the observatory enjoying the minor planets.	JPL · 11350
11351 Leucus	1997 TS_{25}	Leucus, a character in Homer's Iliad, was an Achaean warrior and companion of Odysseus.	JPL · 11351
11352 Koldewey	1997 WP_{22}	Eberhard Koldewey (born 1937), at the DLR Institute of Space Sensor Technology and Planetary Exploration, contributed to the upgrade of the Bochum telescope at the European Southern Observatory, where he participated in many observing campaigns on minor planets. The naming is on the occasion of his retirement.	JPL · 11352
11353 Guillaume	1997 XX_{5}	Guillaume Scholl (born 1987) tested early versions of an automatic code for detecting minor planets developed by his father, astronomer Hans Scholl of the Observatoire de la Côte d´Azur. As a result, recent versions of the code are more user friendly.	JPL · 11353
11356 Chuckjones	1997 YA	Charles Martin "Chuck" Jones, American animator, artist, screenwriter, producer, and director of animated films.	JPL · 11356
11359 Piteglio	1998 BP_{24}	Piteglio, a village in Tuscany	MPC · 11359
11360 Formigine	1998 DL_{14}	Formigine, a small Italian town located 10 km south of Modena.	JPL · 11360
11361 Orbinskij	1998 DD_{36}	Artemij Robertovitch Orbinskij (1862–1927) was a Russian astronomer on the staff of the Odessa department of the Pulkovo Observatory. He made important contributions especially in the field of positional astronomy. The name was suggested by E. Kato	JPL · 11361
11363 Vives	1998 EB_{12}	Juan Luis Vives (1492–1540), a Spanish humanist.	JPL · 11363
11364 Karlštejn	1998 FB_{3}	The Gothic castle at Karlstejn was built in 1348 by Charles IV in the Kingdom of Bohemia, 27 km from the capital, Prague, to guard the crown jewels and state charters. The castle has survived well preserved to the present day, and it symbolizes Czech statehood within Europe.	JPL · 11364
11365 NASA	1998 FK_{126}	NASA (the National Aeronautics and Space Administration).	JPL · 11365
11367 Rachelseevers	1998 HJ_{115}	Rachel Seevers (b. 2001), a finalist in the 2019 Regeneron Science Talent Search, a science competition for high school seniors, for her engineering project. She attended the Paul Laurence Dunbar High School, Lexington, Kentucky	IAU · 11367
11369 Brazelton	1998 QE_{33}	Mary Augusta Brazelton (born 1986), an ISEF awardee in 2002	JPL · 11369
11370 Nabrown	1998 QD_{35}	Nachelle Diane Brown (born 1985), an ISEF awardee in 2002	JPL · 11370
11371 Camley	1998 QO_{38}	Brian Andrew Camley (born 1985), an ISEF awardee in 2002	JPL · 11371
11372 Aditisingh	1998 QP_{41}	Aditi Singh (b. 2001), a finalist in the 2019 Regeneron Science Talent Search, a science competition for high school seniors, for her behavioral and social sciences project. She attended the Horace Greeley High School, Chappaqua, New York.	IAU · 11372
11373 Carbonaro	1998 QG_{49}	Nicole Jean Carbonaro (born 1984), an ISEF awardee in 2002	JPL · 11373
11374 Briantaylor	1998 QU_{60}	Brian W. Taylor (born 1964), a Lowell Observatory instrumentation software specialist, designed the controller for LONEOS and other observatory CCD cameras.	JPL · 11374
11376 Taizomuta	1998 SY_{5}	Taizo Muta (born 1937) is a physicist. His main interest is in the application of quantum field theory to particle physics. He is a discoverer of the MS-bar scheme in quantum chromodynamics. An amateur astronomer, he is currently serving as president of Hiroshima University.	JPL · 11376
11377 Nye	1998 SH_{59}	Ralph A. Nye (born 1945), Lowell Observatory's instrument designer.	JPL · 11377
11378 Dauria	1998 SV_{60}	Florida amateur astronomer Tippy D´Auria (born 1935) is founder of the Winter Star Party.	JPL · 11378
11379 Flaubert	1998 SY_{74}	Gustave Flaubert, French author.	JPL · 11379
11380 Amolsingh	1998 SK_{100}	Amol Singh (b. 2001), a finalist in the 2019 Regeneron Science Talent Search, a science competition for high school seniors, for his computational biology and bioinformatics project. He attended the Lynbrook High School, San Jose, California.	IAU · 11380
11382 Juliasitu	1998 SW_{127}	Julia Situ (b. 2001), a finalist in the 2019 Regeneron Science Talent Search, a science competition for high school seniors, for her cellular and molecular biology project. She attended the Canyon Crest Academy, San Diego, California.	IAU · 11382
11384 Sartre	1998 SW_{143}	Jean-Paul Sartre, French writer and philosopher.	JPL · 11384
11385 Beauvoir	1998 SP_{147}	Simone de Beauvoir, French author, philosopher, and feminist.	JPL · 11385
11392 Paulpeeters	1998 WC_{3}	Paul Peeters, Belgian amateur astronomer.	JPL · 11392
11395 Iphinous	1998 XN_{77}	Iphinous, from Greek mythology. He was killed by Glaukos in hand-to-hand combat.	IAU · 11395
11397 Eriopis	1998 XX_{93}	Eriopis, the mother of Aias, also known as Ajax the Lesser.	IAU · 11397
11400 Raša	1999 AT_{21}	Raša river, Croatia	JPL · 11400

== 11401–11500 ==
back to top

Named minor planet	Provisional	This minor planet was named for...	Ref; Catalog
11401 Pierralba	1999 AF_{25}	Pierre Albanese (born 1992) showed a great interest in the sky, being able to recognize the major planets while he was only four years old. He made drawings inspired by the images obtained by his father, Caussols astronomer Dominique Albanese.	JPL · 11401
11404 Wittig	1999 BX_{4}	Sigmar Wittig (born 1940), chairman of the executive board of the German Aerospace Center during 2002–2007, has been head of the Institute for Thermal Turbomachinery at the University of Karlsruhe, vice president of the German Research Foundation and chair of the European Space Agency Council.	JPL · 11404
11406 Ucciocontin	1999 CY_{14}	Aurelio (Uccio) Contin (1923–2002) was a professional pharmacist, amateur scientist, diver and naturalist. He is well known for his educational and social work.	JPL · 11406
11407 Madsubramanian	1999 CV_{50}	Madhav Subramanian (b. 2000), a finalist in the 2019 Regeneron Science Talent Search, a science competition for high school seniors, for his cellular and molecular biology project. He attended the Jericho Senior High School, Jericho, New York.	IAU · 11407
11408 Zahradník	1999 EG_{3}	Rudolf Zahradník, Czech chemist, co-founder of the Czech school of quantum chemistry, founding father and first president of the Učená společnost České republiky (Learned Society of the Czech Republic), and first president of the Akademie věd České republiky (Academy of Sciences of the Czech Republic)	JPL · 11408
11409 Horkheimer	1999 FD_{9}	Jack Horkheimer, American popularizer of astronomy †	MPC · 11409
11413 Catanach	1999 JG_{21}	Therese Anne Catanach (born 1985), an ISEF awardee in 2002	JPL · 11413
11414 Allanchu	1999 JU_{26}	Allan Chu (born 1984), an ISEF awardee in 2002	JPL · 11414
11417 Chughtai	1999 JW_{117}	Asma Latif Chughtai (born 1986), an ISEF awardee in 2002	JPL · 11417
11418 Williamwang	1999 JN_{118}	William Wang (b. 2001), a finalist in the 2019 Regeneron Science Talent Search, a science competition for high school seniors, for his materials science project. He attended the Oklahoma School of Science and Mathematics, Oklahoma City, Oklahoma.	IAU · 11418
11419 Donjohnson	1999 KS_{2}	Donald Joe Johnson II (1959–2001) went from the field of aerospace to that of a testing engineer working towards the future. He was best known for his kindness, imagination and creativity in storytelling. In his stories he took friends and comrades to the stars in adventures with a brighter future for humanity.	JPL · 11419
11420 Zoeweiss	1999 KR_{14}	Zoe Weiss (b. 2001), a finalist in the 2019 Regeneron Science Talent Search, a science competition for high school seniors, for her computational biology and bioinformatics project. She attended the Lakeside High School, Atlanta, Georgia.	IAU · 11420
11421 Cardano	1999 LW_{2}	Gerolamo Cardano (1501–1576), prototypical Renaissance man, medical doctor, mathematician, astrologer, inventor and gambler.	JPL · 11421
11422 Alilienthal	1999 LD_{7}	Alfred Lilienthal (1889–1970) studied in England and was a businessman in Berlin during the 1930s. He spent the 1940s in Shanghai.	JPL · 11422
11423 Cronin	1999 LT_{24}	Kevin Michael Cronin (born 1984), an ISEF awardee in 2002	JPL · 11423
11425 Wearydunlop	1999 MF	Sir Edward 'Weary' Dunlop, an Australian Army surgeon prisoner-of-war on the Burma railway.	JPL · 11425
11426 Molster	2527 P-L	Lucia Glen Molster (26–27 April 2007) was the beloved daughter of Dutch astronomers Frank and Nathalie Molster.	JPL · 11426
11427 Willemkolff	2611 P-L	Willem Johan Kolff, Dutch-born American internist, inventor of the kidney dialysis machine	JPL · 11427
11428 Alcinoös	4139 P-L	Alcinous, King of Phaiacians and father of Nausicaa in Homer's Odyssey	JPL · 11428
11429 Demodokus	4655 P-L	Demodocus, blind minstrel in Homer's Odyssey.	JPL · 11429
11430 Lodewijkberg	9560 P-L	Lodewijk van den Berg, Dutch-born American astronaut	JPL · 11430
11431 Karelbosscha	4843 T-1	Karel Albert Rudolf Bosscha (1865–1928), a Dutch tea planter, co-founder of the Lembang Observatory near Bandung in the Dutch East Indies, uncle of Rudolf Albert Kerkhoven.	JPL · 11431
11432 Kerkhoven	1052 T-2	Rudolf Albert Kerkhoven (1879–1940) was a notable Dutch tea planter in Malabar, West Java, who, with his uncle Karel Albert Rudolf Bosscha, greatly contributed to the establishment of the Lembang Observatory. His legacy continues to support astronomical research in Indonesia and Holland.	JPL · 11432
11433 Gemmafrisius	3474 T-3	Gemma Frisius (a.k.a. Gemma Phrysius, Gemma Reyneri), 16th-century Dutch geographer, scientist and medical doctor, teacher of Mercator	JPL · 11433
11434 Lohnert	1931 TC_{2}	Karl Lohnert (1885–1944) worked from 1905 to 1907 as an assistant of Max Wolf and discovered four now-numbered minor planets. Lohnert studied psychology in Leipzig and earned his doctorate under Wilhelm Wundt, honoring his mentor by the naming of 635 Vundtia.	JPL · 11434
11437 Cardalda	1971 SB	Carlos Cardalda (1883–1961), Argentine amateur astronomer, cofounder of the Argentinian Association of Amateur Astronomers and instrumental in founding the Asociación de Aficionados a la Astronomía Uruguay	JPL · 11437
11438 Zeldovich	1973 QR_{1}	Yakov Borisovich Zel'dovich, Soviet physicist.	JPL · 11438
11440 Massironi	1975 SC_{2}	Matteo Massironi (born 1967) is a professor at the University of Padova whose research includes the geology of (21) Lutetia and the surface layering of 67P/Churyumov-Gerasimenko using Rosetta spacecraft data.	JPL · 11440
11441 Anadiego	1975 YD	Ana Teresa Diego, an outstanding undergraduate student at La Plata Astronomical.	JPL · 11441
11442 Seijin-Sanso	1976 UN_{14}	Seijin-Sanso, near Kurashiki, Okayama prefecture, is the observing station where famed comet and nova hunter Minoru Honda discovered four of his 12 novae. He was observing there in 1990 on the last night of his life.	JPL · 11442
11443 Youdale	1977 CP	Jack Youdale (1932–2017) was a British amateur astronomer, telescope maker and public outreach advocate. He was Honorary President of the Cleveland and Darlington Astronomical Society from 1979 until his death, and he had a monthly astronomy slot on local radio for over 20 years.	IAU · 11443
11444 Peshekhonov	1978 QA_{2}	Vladimir Grigor'evich Peshekhonov (born 1934), director of the Central Scientific Research Institute "Electropribor", St. Petersburg, is a prominent specialist in naval and space navigation. He has developed a number of high-precision inertial navigation systems for sea vessels and mobile gravimeters for use on the sea shelf.	JPL · 11444
11445 Fedotov	1978 SC_{7}	Victor Andreevich Fedotov (1933–2001), the brilliant conductor of performances in Mariinskij Theatre for more than 35 years.	JPL · 11445
11446 Betankur	1978 TO_{8}	Avgustin Avgustinovich Betankur (1758–1824), a civil engineer who built a gun foundry in Kazan, many bridges and several remarkable buildings, in particular a riding-house in Moscow.	JPL · 11446
11448 Miahajduková	1979 MB_{6}	Mária (Mia) Hajduková Jr. (born 1967) is a research scientist at the Slovak Academy of Science investigating meteoroid orbits, particularly the critical analysis of observational errors leading to apparently hyperbolic orbits.	JPL · 11448
11449 Stephwerner	1979 QP	Stephanie C. Werner (born 1974), a German geophysicist, has investigated the chronostratigraphy and geologic evolutionary history of Mars.	JPL · 11449
11450 Shearer	1979 QJ_{1}	Andrew Shearer (born 1953) an astrophysicist and professor at NUI Galway in Ireland, leads the group working in the field of high-time-resolution astrophysics and image processing. He was responsible for the measurements of the pulsed optical emission from PSR B0656+14 and Geminga (Src).	JPL · 11450
11451 Aarongolden	1979 QR_{1}	Aaron Golden (born 1969), of the National University of Ireland, Galway, works in the field of high-time resolution astrophysics and image processing. He participated in the discovery of optical pulsations from two pulsars.	JPL · 11451
11453 Cañada-Assandri	1981 DS_{1}	Marcela Cañada-Assandri (born 1976) is an astronomer at the El Leoncito Observatory in San Juan, Argentina, where she has worked on polarimetry of main-belt asteroids and the dynamics of the Hungaria group.	JPL · 11453
11454 Mariomelita	1981 DT_{2}	Mario Daniel Melita (born 1964) is a professor at the Instituto de Astronomía y Física del Espacio (IAFE) of the Universidad de Buenos Aires, specializing in dynamical and physical properties of small solar system bodies.	JPL · 11454
11455 Richardstarr	1981 EN_{4}	Richard Starr (born 1950) of the Catholic University of America is an expert in planetary X-ray, gamma-ray, and neutron spectroscopy, including their application to asteroid missions.	JPL · 11455
11456 Cotto-Figueroa	1981 EK_{9}	Desiree Cotto-Figueroa (born 1984) is a professor at the University of Puerto Rico, Humacao whose research includes shape and spin evolution of near-Earth asteroids in response to re-radiation of solar flux.	JPL · 11456
11457 Hitomikobayashi	1981 EF_{12}	Hitomi Kobayashi (born 1984) is a Japanese researcher who studies formation and evolution of cometary organic volatiles based on observations and laboratory experiments.	JPL · 11457
11458 Rosemarypike	1981 EV_{12}	Rosemary E. Pike (born 1984) is a postdoctoral fellow at the Institute of Astronomy and Astrophysics, Academia Sinica (Taiwan) who studies complex resonances in the Kuiper belt, particularly the stability of the 5:1 resonance with Neptune.	JPL · 11458
11459 Andráspál	1981 ET_{13}	András Pál (born 1981) is a researcher at the Konkoly Observatory in Budapest who develops computer tools for the processing and interpretation of small body visual and infrared observations.	JPL · 11459
11460 Juliafang	1981 EZ_{15}	Julia Fang (born 1987) completed her PhD work at UCLA using observational data and numerical integrations in the dynamical study of multiple asteroid systems, both in the near-Earth and main belt populations.	JPL · 11460
11461 Wladimirneumann	1981 EM_{18}	Wladimir Neumann (born 1981) is a researcher at the German Aerospace Center (DLR-Berlin) who studies water-rock differentiation of icy bodies applicable to interpreting Ceres data from the Dawn mission.	JPL · 11461
11462 Hsingwenlin	1981 ES_{23}	Hsing-Wen "Edward" Lin (born 1982) is a postdoctoral researcher at the National Central University of Taiwan whose research spans from trans-Neptunian objects, to Centaurs, Neptune Trojans and main-belt asteroids.	JPL · 11462
11463 Petrpokorny	1981 EN_{24}	Petr Pokorný (born 1986) is a Czech astrophysicist specializing in numerical models of the solar system dust complex and observational interpretation of meteor radar measurements.	JPL · 11463
11464 Moser	1981 EL_{28}	Danielle Moser (born 1980) is a scientist working for the NASA Meteoroid Environment Office whose research includes meteor shower forecasting and estimating the energies of lunar impactors.	JPL · 11464
11465 Fulvio	1981 EP_{30}	Daniele Fulvio (born 1979) is a professor of physics at the Pontificia Universidade Católica do Rio de Janeiro performing laboratory simulation of asteroid space weathering through ion irradiation of meteorite samples.	JPL · 11465
11466 Katharinaotto	1981 EL_{33}	Katharina A. Otto (born 1984) is a scientist at the German Aerospace Center (DLR-Berlin) studying the effects of Coriolis force in shaping surface features on Vesta through analysis of Dawn spacecraft images.	JPL · 11466
11467 Simonporter	1981 EA_{36}	Simon B. Porter (born 1984) is a postdoctoral researcher at Southwest Research Institute (Boulder, Colorado) whose studies include tidal dissipation and stability in trans-Neptunian binary systems.	JPL · 11467
11468 Shantanunaidu	1981 EU_{42}	Shantanu Naidu (born 1985) is a postdoctoral researcher at the Jet Propulsion Laboratory who combines dynamical theory and radar observations for asteroid physical studies, including spin-orbit coupling interactions in binary asteroid systems.	JPL · 11468
11469 Rozitis	1981 EZ_{42}	Benjamin Rozitis (born 1984) is a research fellow at the Open University (UK) studying the physical and dynamical characterization of asteroid surfaces through spacecraft data, modeling, and microgravity experiments.	JPL · 11469
11470 Davidminton	1981 EE_{47}	David Minton (born 1976) is a professor at Purdue University investigating the dynamical history of the main asteroid belt and its connection with terrestrial impacts.	JPL · 11470
11471 Toshihirabayashi	1981 EH_{48}	Masatoshi Hirabayashi (born 1983) is a postdoctoral researcher at Purdue University specializing in modeling structural stresses experienced by rotating asteroids and comet nuclei.	JPL · 11471
11473 Barbaresco	1982 SC	Barbaresco is a beautiful little Italian town in the Langhe region of Piedmont.	MPC · 11473
11475 Velinský	1982 VL	Jaroslav Velinský (1932–2012), nickname Kapitán Kid, was a Czech science fiction and detective novel writer, publisher, songwriter and musician. He was one of the founders of the Czech folk festival, Porta.	JPL · 11475
11476 Stefanosimoni	1984 HH_{1}	Stefano Simoni (born 1974) is an Italian amateur astronomer. He created and maintains a very popular non-profit Italian blog devoted to the dissemination of astronomy and astrophysics.	JPL · 11476
11480 Velikij Ustyug	1986 RW_{5}	Veliky Ustyug, Russia.	JPL · 11480
11481 Znannya	1987 WO_{1}	Znannya, a scientific society founded in Kyiv in 1948 by Ukrainian astronomer Sergej Konstantinovich Vsekhsvyatskij and other scientists. It propagates knowledge in astronomy, physics, history and other sciences in Ukraine and elsewhere.	JPL · 11481
11484 Daudet	1988 DF_{2}	Alphonse Daudet (1840–1897), a French novelist who is remembered as a writer of sentimental tales, believed that the world was misrepresented by novelists, who concentrated only on its uglier aspects. His Lettres de mon Moulin (1869) can therefore be considered a more joyful interpretation of the mystery of things and of individuals.	JPL · 11484
11485 Zinzendorf	1988 RW_{3}	Nikolaus Ludwig, Graf von Zinzendorf (1700–1760), a counsellor at the court of his native town of Dresden (1721–1727).	JPL · 11485
11488 Zeleia	1988 RM_{11}	Zeleia, a town beneath Mount Ida whose warriors, led by Pandaros, fought among the allies of Troy in Homer’s Iliad.	IAU · 11488
11492 Shimose	1988 VR_{3}	Nobuo Shimose (born 1944) is well known in Yamaguchi prefecture as a professional cameraman of the first order, as well as an amateur astronomer. He is also the leader of the Yamaguchi Astronomical Society and the Hagi Astronomical Club.	JPL · 11492
11494 Hibiki	1988 VM_{9}	The Sea of Hibiki, an open-sea region between the Fukuoka and Yamaguchi prefectures. The asteroid's name was selected from candidates proposed by children who attended the Fureai Space Festival, held in the city of Kitakyushu on the Japanese Space Day in 2005 (also see citation for 11933 Himuka).	JPL · 11494
11495 Fukunaga	1988 XR	Yasutoshi Fukunaga (born 1951) is a well-known amateur astronomer in Yamaguchi prefecture, the site of frequent star parties. He is the head of the astronomy club in his home in the Syunan area.	JPL · 11495
11496 Grass	1989 AG_{7}	Günter Grass (1927–2015), a German writer, sculptor and graphic artist, is a critic of both the immediate postwar years and the present. His passionate writing received only partial recognition in Germany but great acclaim elsewhere. He won the 1999 Nobel Prize for literature.	JPL · 11496
11498 Julgeerts	1989 GS_{4}	Julien Armand Geerts (born 1909) is a well-known commercial artist in Belgium. He was for many years a good friend of the discoverer's parents.	JPL · 11498
11499 Duras	1989 RL	Marguerite Duras (1914–1996), was a French novelist who became internationally known for the screenplay of Hiroshima mon amour (1959). Her semi-autobiographical novel L'Amant was nominated for the Prix Goncourt in 1984.	JPL · 11499
11500 Tomaiyowit	1989 UR	Tomaiyowit, Earth Mother in the Luiseno creation story; together with Tukmit, she gave birth to the First People	JPL · 11500

== 11501–11600 ==
back to top

Named minor planet	Provisional	This minor planet was named for...	Ref; Catalog
11501 Ushimaru	1989 UU_{3}	Kouhei Ushimaru, Japanese amateur astronomer living in Hida City, Gifu Prefecture.	IAU · 11501
11504 Kazo	1990 BT	Kazo, a Japanese city in Saitama prefecture, near Tokyo	JPL · 11504
11506 Toulouse-Lautrec	1990 ES_{1}	Henri de Toulouse-Lautrec (1864–1901), a French painter	JPL · 11506
11507 Danpascu	1990 OF	Dan Pascu (born 1938), astronomer and astrometrist U.S. Naval Observatory, who he rediscovered and co-discovered Janus and Calypso, two moons of Saturn, respectively	JPL · 11507
11508 Stolte	1990 TF_{13}	Dieter Stolte (born 1934) served for 20 years as director general of ZDF, the public German TV net and one of the largest European TV stations. A professor of media research, Stolte initiated international TV channels (ARTE, 3SAT) in a European cooperation.	JPL · 11508
11509 Thersilochos	1990 VL_{6}	Thersilochus, a Trojan warrior from the rich valleys of Paeonia. He showed up, together with Hector, at the battle for the dead body of Patrocles, and was later killed by Achilles.	JPL · 11509
11510 Borges	1990 VV_{8}	Jorge Luis Borges (1899–1986), an Argentine poet and short-story writer	JPL · 11510
11511 Billknopf	1990 WK_{2}	William Knopf (b. 1959), an American Program Executive in the Planetary Science Division, NASA HQ, Washington, DC with expertise in physics, computer science and project management.	IAU · 11511
11514 Tsunenaga	1991 CO_{1}	Hasekura Tsunenaga (1571–1622), who, in 1613, led the first Japanese mission across the Pacific to the Americas (in Mexico), and he continued across the Atlantic to Europe, where he met with king Philip III of Spain and pope Paul V. His portrait was designated a national treasure for the first time in Sendai in June 2001.	JPL · 11514
11515 Oshijyo	1991 CR_{1}	Oshijyo, the symbol of Gyoda Ichi, is located in the central part of that city and dates from the Muromachi period	JPL · 11515
11516 Arthurpage	1991 ED	Arthur Page (born 1922), an Australian astronomer and founder of the Astronomical Association of Queensland	JPL · 11516
11517 Esteracuna	1991 EA_{4}	Maria Ester Acuna Castillo (born 1951), a longtime caretaker at the Manuel Foster Observatory in Santiago, Chile	JPL · 11517
11518 Jung	1991 GB_{3}	Carl Gustav Jung (1875–1961), a Swiss psychiatrist	JPL · 11518
11519 Adler	1991 GZ_{4}	Alfred Adler (1870–1937), an Austrian medical doctor and psychiatrist	JPL · 11519
11520 Fromm	1991 GE_{8}	Erich Fromm (1900–1980), a German psychoanalyst	JPL · 11520
11521 Erikson	1991 GE_{9}	Erik H. Erikson (1902–1994), a German-American psychoanalyst.	JPL · 11521
11524 Pleyel	1991 PY_{2}	Ignaz Pleyel (1757–1831), an Austrian-born French composer and piano builder	JPL · 11524
11528 Mie	1991 XH	Mie Nagata (born 1963), a lecturer at the Gotoh Planetarium and Astronomical Museum in Tokyo from 1988 to 1994	JPL · 11528
11530 d'Indy	1992 CP_{2}	Vincent d'Indy (1851–1931), a French composer	JPL · 11530
11532 Gullin	1992 ER_{4}	Lars Gullin (1928–1976), a Swedish jazz musician and composer, known for his style of playing the baritone saxophone	JPL · 11532
11533 Akebäck	1992 EG_{6}	Akebäck, a small socken located on the Swedish island of Gotland	JPL · 11533
11537 Guericke	1992 HY_{6}	Otto von Guericke (1602–1686), a German physicist and inventor of the air pump and centrifuge	JPL · 11537
11538 Brunico	1992 OJ_{8}	Bruneck (Brunico), an Italian town in South Tirol	JPL · 11538
11542 Solikamsk	1992 SU_{21}	Solikamsk, a Russian city in the Perm region near the Ural Mountains	JPL · 11542
11545 Hashimoto	1992 UE_{4}	Kunihiko Hashimoto (born 1951), a Japanese amateur astronomer and member of the Fukuoka Astronomical Society	JPL · 11545
11546 Miyoshimachi	1992 UM_{6}	Miyoshi, a Japanese town located in Saitama Prefecture	JPL · 11546
11547 Griesser	1992 UP_{8}	Markus Griesser (born 1949), a Swiss amateur astronomer at Eschenberg Observatory	MPC · 11547
11548 Jerrylewis	1992 WD_{8}	Jerry Lewis (born 1926), an American comedian	JPL · 11548
11552 Boucolion	1993 BD_{4}	Boucolion a character from Greek mythology. He is the father of the Trojan warriors Pedasos and Aesopos, who both died near the River Scamander.	JPL · 11552
11553 Scheria	1993 BD_{6}	Scheria (Corfu), one of the Greek Ionian islands, which was first mentioned in Homer's Odyssey	JPL · 11553
11554 Asios	1993 BZ_{12}	Asios, a Trojan warrior and one of the leaders in the assault on the Greek wall. He challenged Idomeneos and was killed by him.	JPL · 11554
11569 Virgilsmith	1993 KB_{2}	The design and construction abilities of Virgil Smith (born 1941), of Corona, Arizona, have resulted in the successful completion of the Jarnac Observatory, located at the home of the second discoverer.	JPL · 11569
11571 Daens	1993 OR_{8}	Adolf Daens (1839–1907), a Flemish priest from Aalst, Belgium	JPL · 11571
11572 Schindler	1993 RM_{7}	Oskar Schindler (1905–1974), a German industrialist	JPL · 11572
11573 Helmholtz	1993 SK_{3}	Hermann von Helmholtz (1821–1894), a German doctor, physiologist and physicist.	JPL · 11573
11574 d'Alviella	1994 BP_{3}	Eugène Goblet d'Alviella (1846–1925), a senator of Belgium, lawyer, Professor of the history of religions, and rector of the Universite Libre de Bruxelles	JPL · 11574
11575 Claudio	1994 BN_{4}	Claudio Deponte (born 1960), an Italian amateur astronomer and long-term secretary of the astronomical society at the Farra d'Isonzo Observatory (Circolo Culturale Astronomico di Farra d'Isonzo).	IAU · 11575
11577 Einasto	1994 CO_{17}	Jaan Einasto (born 1929), and Estonian astronomer and one of the discoverers of dark matter	JPL · 11577
11578 Cimabue	1994 EB	Cimabue (1240–1302), an Italian painter and designer of mosaics from Florence	JPL · 11578
11579 Tsujitsuka	1994 JN	Takashi Tsujitsuka (born 1961), a Japanese elementary school teacher and amateur astronomer. His main interests lie in observing stellar occultations at his private observatory, where he also indulges in his favorite pastime of polishing mirrors for reflecting telescopes.	JPL · 11579
11580 Bautzen	1994 JG_{4}	Bautzen, a German town in eastern Saxony	JPL · 11580
11581 Philipdejager	1994 PK_{9}	Philip de Jager (born 1969), a Belgian percussionist	JPL · 11581
11582 Bleuler	1994 PC_{14}	Eugen Bleuler (1857–1939), Swiss psychiatrist	JPL · 11582
11583 Breuer	1994 PZ_{28}	Jozef Breuer (1842–1925), an Austrian medical doctor	JPL · 11583
11584 Ferenczi	1994 PP_{39}	Sándor Ferenczi (1873–1933), a Hungarian psychoanalyst	MPC · 11584
11585 Orlandelassus	1994 RB_{17}	Orlande de Lassus (1532–1594), a Franco-Flemish composer	JPL · 11585
11588 Gottfriedkeller	1994 UZ_{12}	Gottfried Keller (1819–1890), a Swiss author	JPL · 11588
11592 Clintkelly	1995 FA_{7}	Clint Kelly, senior vice president for Advanced Technology Development at Science Applications International Corporation since 1988.	JPL · 11592
11593 Uchikawa	1995 HK	Yoshihisa Uchikawa (born 1947) is one of the leading amateur astronomers from Saga prefecture and the Kyushu district.	JPL · 11593
11595 Monsummano	1995 KN	Monsummano Terme, an Italian village in Northern Tuscany	MPC · 11595
11596 Francetic	1995 KA_{1}	Daniel Francetic (1933–2014), American director and space science educator of the Euclid High School Planetarium in Euclid, Ohio. Past president of the Great Lakes Planetarium Association and founding member of the Cleveland Regional Association of Planetariums, his passion for teaching astronomy touched innumerable students	JPL · 11596
11598 Kubík	1995 OJ	Jakub Šaroun (born 1974), brother of Czech discoverer Lenka Kotková	JPL · 11598
11600 Cipolla	1995 SQ_{2}	Carlo Cipolla (born 1925), an Italian chemist and amateur astronomer	JPL · 11600

== 11601–11700 ==
back to top

Named minor planet	Provisional	This minor planet was named for...	Ref; Catalog
11602 Miryang	1995 ST_{54}	Miryang, South Korea, birthplace of the discovery team leader's wife, Chung-hi Koh (Helen) Weber	JPL · 11602
11604 Novigrad	1995 UB_{1}	Novigrad, also known as Novigrad Istarski and Cittanova d'Istria, a town and a municipality in Istria, Croatia. The city is located close to the mouth of the river Mirna, on a small island that was connected with the mainland in the eighteenth century.	JPL · 11604
11605 Ranfagni	1995 UP_{6}	Piero Ranfagni (born 1949) worked for many years as a technician at Arcetri Astrophysical Observatory. He is on the technical staff of the TIRGO Telescope and in the project office of LBT. He has also been very active in the history of astronomy and in popular astronomy.	JPL · 11605
11606 Almary	1995 UU_{6}	Alfred and Mary Tholen, the parents of the discoverer, David Tholen, on the occasion of their 50th wedding anniversary.	JPL · 11606
11612 Obu	1995 YZ_{1}	The Japanese city of Ōbu, located in the center of Aichi Prefecture, where the discoverer Akimasa Nakamura lived for six and a half years.	JPL · 11612
11614 Istropolitana	1996 AD_{2}	Universitas Istropolitana in Bratislava, was the first university in present-day Slovakia and an ancient predecessor of Comenius University.	JPL · 11614
11615 Naoya	1996 AE_{4}	Naoya Matsumoto (born 1952) is a Japanese amateur astronomer and president of the Nagasaki Astronomical Society.	JPL · 11615
11620 Susanagordon	1996 OE_{2}	Susana Gordon (born 1958) has dedicated most of her adult life as a dialysis caregiver at the Good Samaritan Hospital in New York. She moved to Tucson, Arizona, in the late 1990s, where she is a massage therapist. Her interests include gems and minerals, photography and dancing	JPL · 11620
11621 Duccio	1996 PJ_{5}	Duccio Bartolini (born 1976) is the younger son of the first discoverer.	JPL · 11621
11622 Samuele	1996 RD_{4}	Samuele Marconi (born 1975), an active Italian amateur astronomer at the San Marcello Observatory who spends much of his time giving public lectures on astronomy. at the Pistoia Mountains Astronomical Observatory in San Marcello Pistoiese.	JPL · 11622
11623 Kagekatu	1996 TC_{10}	Kagekatu Uesugi (1555–1623) was a military commander during the Japanese feudal period. He was lord of Echigo Kasugayama castle from 1578, of Mutu Aizu castle from 1598 and of Dewa Yonezawa castle from 1601.	JPL · 11623
11625 Francelinda	1996 UL_{1}	Francesca and Linda Tesi, granddaughters of the co-discoverer Luciano Tesi	MPC · 11625
11626 Church Stretton	1996 VW_{2}	The small town of Church Stretton is set amidst the South Shropshire hills of western England. It is the location of the Church Stretton Observatory, where this minor planet was discovered.	JPL · 11626
11628 Katuhikoikeda	1996 VB_{5}	Katuhiko Ikeda (born 1958) is a Japanese amateur astronomer and professional engineer. As a developer and repairer of electrical devices, he helps maintain the Moriyama Observatory (900).	JPL · 11628
11636 Pezinok	1996 YH_{1}	Pezinok, a small town near Bratislava.	JPL · 11636
11637 Yangjiachi	1996 YJ_{2}	Yang Jiachi (1919–2016), an expert in automatic control and space technology, devoted himself to the development of artificial earth satellites in China.	JPL · 11637
11652 Johnbrownlee	1997 CK_{13}	John W. Brownlee (born 1973) was the system administrator, principal programmer and an observer on the Catalina Sky Survey team during 1998–2000.Src	JPL · 11652
11656 Lipno	1997 EL_{6}	The Lipno dam in South Bohemia, Czech Republic. It was built on the Vltava river in 1959 as the largest Czechoslovak dam. It is important for the water supply, as a source of power and also as a well-known South Bohemian holiday area.	JPL · 11656
11657 Antonhajduk	1997 EN_{7}	Anton Hajduk (born 1933) is a professor of astronomy at the Slovak Academy of Sciences. His research centers on the structure of meteor streams and radio studies of meteor head echoes and the secondary ozone layer.	JPL · 11657
11664 Kashiwagi	1997 GX_{24}	Shuji Kashiwagi (born 1952) is a junior high school teacher and associate president of the Astronomical Society of Oita.	JPL · 11664
11665 Dirichlet	1997 GL_{28}	Peter Gustav Lejeune Dirichlet (1805–1859) was the successor of Gauss and the predecessor of Riemann at Göttingen. He made important contributions in both pure and applied mathematics and gave the first rigorous proof of the convergence of Fourier series.	JPL · 11665
11666 Bracker	1997 MD_{8}	Steve Bracker (born 1942) is a renaissance man – particle physicist, harpsichordist, astronomer, naturalist and software guru. The very first programmer with the Cerro Tololo Inter-American Observatory in Chile, he continued his involvement in astronomy with the Sloan Digital Sky Survey.	JPL · 11666
11667 Testa	1997 UB_{1}	Augusto Testa (born 1950), Italian amateur astronomer and discoverer of minor planets at the Sormano Astronomical Observatory in northern Italy. Over the past few years he has developed a lot of software dedicated to the observation of minor planets, and these are widely used by the Italian community of astrometric observers.	JPL · 11667
11668 Balios	1997 VV_{1}	Balius (in Latin: Balios) was one of the two immortal horses of the Greek hero Achilles who took them to draw his chariot during the Trojan War.	JPL · 11668
11669 Pascalscholl	1997 XY_{8}	Pascal Scholl (born 1994) is the younger son of astronomer Hans Scholl.	JPL · 11669
11670 Fountain	1998 AU_{9}	Glen Harold Fountain (born 1942) is the project manager of the New Horizons Pluto Kuiper Belt mission.	JPL · 11670
11672 Cuney	1998 BC_{15}	Husband and wife team Bruce (born 1947) and Dana (born 1950) Cuney work at Palomar and were responsible for the remodeling of the old 1.2-m Schmidt dome interior.	JPL · 11672
11673 Baur	1998 BJ_{19}	Johann M. Baur (1930–2007), was a German amateur astronomer, discoverer of minor planets and founder of the Chaonis Observatory (567) in northern Italy.	JPL · 11673
11675 Billboyle	1998 CP_{2}	William Boyle (born 1924), co-invented the CCD while at Bell Laboratories in 1969.	JPL · 11675
11678 Brevard	1998 DT_{10}	Brevard County, Florida.	JPL · 11678
11679 Brucebaker	1998 DE_{11}	Bruce Baker (1949-2021), fabricated and installed the mechanical portions of the slip rings and assisted in the fabrication of many small mechanical assemblies needed throughout the upgrade of the 1.2-m Schmidt at Palomar.	JPL · 11679
11681 Ortner	1998 EP_{6}	Johannes Ortner (born 1933) is founder and unique director of the Summer School Alpbach. Held annually since 1975, Alpbach provides in-depth teaching on all aspects of space science and technology for European students, culminating in the design of innovative space-mission proposals.	JPL · 11681
11682 Shiwaku	1998 EX_{6}	Hideaki Shiwaku (born 1963) is one of promoters of the Matsue Astronomical Club, an amateur astronomers group in the Matsue area of Japan, and a good friend of the discoverer, Hiroshi Abe.	JPL · 11682
11685 Adamcurry	1998 FW_{19}	Adam Michael Curry (born 1984), an ISEF awardee in 2002	JPL · 11685
11686 Samuelweissman	1998 FU_{36}	Samuel Weissman (b. 2001), a finalist in the 2019 Regeneron Science Talent Search, a science competition for high school seniors, for his cellular and molecular biology project. He attended the Harriton High School, Rosemont, Pennsylvania.	IAU · 11686
11688 Amandugan	1998 FG_{53}	Amanda Dyann Dugan (born 1986), an ISEF awardee in 2002	JPL · 11688
11689 Frankxu	1998 FA_{56}	Frank Z. Xu (b. 2001), a finalist in the 2019 Regeneron Science Talent Search, a science competition for high school seniors, for his biochemistry project. He attended the Brookline High School, Brookline, Massachusetts.	IAU · 11689
11690 Carodulaney	1998 FV_{60}	Caroline Ann DuLaney (born 1985), an ISEF awardee in 2002	JPL · 11690
11691 Easterwood	1998 FO_{66}	Jeffrey Michael Easterwood (born 1985), an ISEF awardee in 2002	JPL · 11691
11693 Grantelliott	1998 FE_{69}	Grant A. Elliott (born 1984), an ISEF awardee in 2002	JPL · 11693
11694 Esterhuysen	1998 FO_{70}	Stephanus Albertus Esterhuysen (born 1983), an ISEF awardee in 2002	JPL · 11694
11695 Mattei	1998 FA_{74}	Janet Akyüz Mattei (1943–2004), was a Turkish–American astronomer and promoter of the observation of variable stars by amateurs, and long-time director of the American Association of Variable Star Observers from 1973 to 2004.	JPL · 11695
11696 Capen	1998 FD_{74}	Charles ("Chick") Franklin Capen (1926–1986) was best known for his observations of the planets, particularly Mars.	JPL · 11696
11697 Estrella	1998 FX_{98}	Allan Noriel Estrella (born 1984), an ISEF awardee in 2002	JPL · 11697
11698 Fichtelman	1998 FZ_{102}	Jon Roger Fichtelman (born 1986), an ISEF awardee in 2002	JPL · 11698

== 11701–11800 ==
back to top

Named minor planet	Provisional	This minor planet was named for...	Ref; Catalog
11701 Madeleineyang	1998 FY_{116}	Madeleine L. Yang (b. 2001), a finalist in the 2019 Regeneron Science Talent Search, a science competition for high school seniors, for her bioengineering project. She attended the Detroit Country Day School, Beverly Hills, Michigan.	IAU · 11701
11702 Mifischer	1998 FE_{117}	Michael Henry Fischer (born 1985), an ISEF awardee in 2002	JPL · 11702
11703 Glassman	1998 FL_{121}	Elena Leah Glassman (born 1986), an ISEF awardee in 2002	JPL · 11703
11704 Gorin	1998 FZ_{130}	Michael Adam Gorin (born 1985), an ISEF awardee in 2002	JPL · 11704
11706 Rijeka	1998 HV_{4}	Rijeka, the principal seaport of Croatia, located on Kvarner Bay, an inlet of the Adriatic Sea.	JPL · 11706
11707 Grigery	1998 HW_{17}	Chelsea Nicole Grigery (born 1986), an ISEF awardee in 2002	JPL · 11707
11708 Kathyfries	1998 HT_{19}	Kathy Fries, 2019 Regeneron Science Talent Search mentor	IAU · 11708
11709 Eudoxos	1998 HF_{20}	Eudoxos of Knidos (c. 408-355 B.C.) was the prime mover behind two major developments in Greek mathematical thought: the theory of proportions that overcame the crisis caused by the discovery of irrational numbers, and the method of exhaustion for the calculation of areas and volumest.	JPL · 11709
11710 Nataliehale	1998 HS_{34}	Natalie Adele Hale (born 1986), an ISEF awardee in 2002	JPL · 11710
11711 Urquiza	1998 HV_{50}	Luis Urquiza del Valle (1906–2000) was the much-loved grandfather of LONEOS observer L. Levy.	JPL · 11711
11712 Kemcook	1998 HB_{51}	Kem H. Cook (born 1949), of Lawrence Livermore National Laboratory, is a founding member of the Massive Compact Halo Objects (MACHO) Project, which used a refurbished, 120-year-old telescope (The Great Melbourne Telescope) to survey the Magellanic Clouds for gravitational microlensing by baryonic, halo dark matter.	JPL · 11712
11713 Stubbs	1998 HG_{51}	Christopher Stubbs (born 1958), of the University of Washington, has pursued a variety of projects in experimental physics and observational astrophysics, including searching for dark matter, measuring the rate of expansion of the universe with supernovae and testing the equivalence principle.	JPL · 11713
11714 Mikebrown	1998 HQ_{51}	Michael E. Brown (born 1965), assistant professor of astronomy at the California Institute of Technology.	JPL · 11714
11715 Harperclark	1998 HA_{75}	Elizabeth Dee Pauline Harper-Clark (born 1984), an ISEF awardee in 2002	MPC · 11715
11716 Amahartman	1998 HY_{79}	Amanda Nicole Hartman (born 1987), an ISEF awardee in 2002	JPL · 11716
11718 Hayward	1998 HD_{95}	Nicholas Mark Edward Alexander Hayward (born 1984), an ISEF awardee in 2002	JPL · 11718
11719 Hicklen	1998 HT_{98}	Rachel Scarlett Hicklen (born 1984), an ISEF awardee in 2002	JPL · 11719
11720 Horodyskyj	1998 HZ_{99}	Ulyana N. Horodyskyj (born 1986), an ISEF awardee in 2002	JPL · 11720
11721 Shawnlowe	1998 HE_{100}	Shawn Lowe, 2019 Regeneron Science Talent Search mentor	IAU · 11721
11723 Briankennedy	1998 HT_{125}	Brian Kennedy, 2019 Regeneron Science Talent Search mentor	IAU · 11723
11724 Ronaldhsu	1998 HH_{146}	Ronald Hsu (born 1985), an ISEF awardee in 2002	JPL · 11724
11725 Victoriahsu	1998 HM_{146}	Victoria Hsu (born 1987), an ISEF awardee in 2002	JPL · 11725
11726 Edgerton	1998 JA	Harold "Doc" Eugene Edgerton (1903–1990), born in Fremont, Nebraska, was professor of electrical engineering at the Massachusetts Institute of Technology during 1928–1966.	JPL · 11726
11727 Sweet	1998 JM_{1}	During the 1.2-m Schmidt conversion Merle Sweet (born 1942), assistant superintendent at the Palomar Observatory, assisted in overseeing the details in the layout and construction of the slip-ring trolleys. He also worked in the rewiring of the dome.	JPL · 11727
11728 Einer	1998 JC_{2}	Steve Einer (born 1955), a Palomar Observatory technician.	JPL · 11728
11730 Yanhua	1998 KO_{31}	Yan Hua (born 1984), an ISEF awardee in 2002	JPL · 11730
11735 Isabellecohen	1998 KN_{56}	Isabelle Cohen, 2019 Regeneron Science Talent Search mentor	IAU · 11735
11736 Viktorfischl	1998 QS_{1}	Viktor Fischl Avigdor Dagan (born 1912) is a frequently translated Czech-Israeli writer who put ethical values into literature through his stylistic and linguistic mastery, in which he emphasizes responsibility for interpersonal relations, love, tolerance and respect.	JPL · 11736
11737 Gregneat	1998 QL_{24}	Greg Neat, 2019 Regeneron Science Talent Search mentor	IAU · 11737
11739 Baton Rouge	1998 SG_{27}	Baton Rouge, Louisiana.	JPL · 11739
11740 Georgesmith	1998 UK_{6}	George Smith (born 1930) co-invented the CCD while at Bell Laboratories in 1969.	JPL · 11740
11743 Jachowski	1999 JP_{130}	Matthew Douglas Apau Jachowski (born 1985), an ISEF awardee in 2002	JPL · 11743
11746 Thomjansen	1999 NG_{4}	Thomas Scott Jansen (born 1986), an ISEF awardee in 2002	JPL · 11746
11747 Libbykamen	1999 NQ_{9}	Libby Kamen, 2019 Regeneron Science Talent Search mentor	IAU · 11747
11751 Davidcarroll	1999 NK_{37}	David Carroll, 2019 Regeneron Science Talent Search mentor	IAU · 11751
11752 Masatakesagai	1999 OU_{3}	Masatake Sagai (born 1950) became a member of the Nanyo Astronomical Club in 1985 and is an active popularizer of astronomy.	JPL · 11752
11753 Geoffburbidge	2064 P-L	Geoffrey Ronald Burbidge, British-American physicist.	JPL · 11753
11754 Herbig	2560 P-L	George Herbig (1920–2013), American astronomer and co-discoverer of the Herbig–Haro objects	JPL · 11754
11755 Paczynski	2691 P-L	Bohdan Paczyński, Polish astronomer.	JPL · 11755
11756 Geneparker	2779 P-L	Eugene Parker (1927–2022), American astronomer.	JPL · 11756
11757 Salpeter	2799 P-L	Edwin Ernest Salpeter, Austrian astronomer.	JPL · 11757
11758 Sargent	4035 P-L	Wallace Sargent, a British astrophysicist.	JPL · 11758
11759 Sunyaev	4075 P-L	Rashid Sunyaev, Uzbek astrophysicist.	JPL · 11759
11760 Auwers	4090 P-L	Arthur Auwers (Georg Friedrich Julius Arthur von Auwers), 19th–20th-century German astronomer, director of the Potsdam Observatory from 1881, author of the first reference catalogue of fundamental star positions	JPL · 11760
11761 Davidgill	4868 P-L	David Gill, 19th–20th-century British astronomer and instrument designer, director of the Cape Observatory	JPL · 11761
11762 Vogel	6044 P-L	Hermann Carl Vogel (1841–1907) was a German astronomer and spectroscopist. He invented an early scheme to classify stellar spectra and confirmed the sun's rotation. He directed the Potsdam Astrophysical Observatory from 1882 to 1907.	JPL · 11762
11763 Deslandres	6303 P-L	Henri-Alexandre Deslandres (1853–1948) was a French astrophysicist and observatory director. An independent inventor of the spectroheliograph, he investigated molecular spectra in the laboratory and observed the solar chromosphere.	JPL · 11763
11764 Benbaillaud	6531 P-L	Édouard Benjamin Baillaud19th–20th-century French director of the Toulouse (1878–1907) and Paris (1907–1926) observatories, founder of the Observatoire du Pic du Midi, first president of the International Astronomical Union	JPL · 11764
11765 Alfredfowler	9057 P-L	Alfred Fowler, 19th–20th-century British astrophysicist, first general secretary of the International Astronomical Union	JPL · 11765
11766 Fredseares	9073 P-L	Frederick H. Seares, 19th–20th-century American astronomer, standardizer of the stellar magnitude system	JPL · 11766
11767 Milne	3224 T-1	E. Arthur Milne, 20th-century British mathematician and astrophysicist	JPL · 11767
11768 Merrill	4107 T-1	Paul W. Merrill, 20th-century American spectroscopist, first to detect a short-lived isotope of technetium in the atmospheres of stars, thus confirming stellar nucleosynthesis	JPL · 11768
11769 Alfredjoy	2199 T-2	Alfred H. Joy, 20th-century American astronomer, inventor of the T Tauri classification	JPL · 11769
11770 Rudominkowski	3163 T-2	Rudolph Minkowski, 20th-century German-American astronomer	JPL · 11770
11771 Maestlin	4136 T-2	Michael Maestlin (1550–1631), professor of astronomy at Tübingen.	JPL · 11771
11772 Jacoblemaire	4210 T-2	Jacob Le Maire, Dutch explorer, after whom the Straits of Lemaire are named; he was, along with Schouten, one of the first westerners to visit Tonga †	MPC · 11772
11773 Schouten	1021 T-3	Willem Schouten, Dutch explorer who discovered Cape Horn †	MPC · 11773
11774 Jerne	1128 T-3	Niels Kaj Jerne, British-born (of Danish parentage) immunologist, joint winner of the 1984 Nobel Prize for Medicine and Physiology.	JPL · 11774
11775 Köhler	3224 T-3	Georges J. F. Köhler, German biologist, joint winner of the 1984 Nobel Prize for Medicine and Physiology.	JPL · 11775
11776 Milstein	3460 T-3	César Milstein, Argentinian biochemist, joint winner of the 1984 Nobel Prize for Medicine and Physiology.	JPL · 11776
11777 Hargrave	3526 T-3	Lawrence Hargrave (1850–1915), Australian astronomer and aviation pioneer.	JPL · 11777
11778 Kingsford Smith	4102 T-3	Sir Charles Edward Kingsford Smith, Australian aviator.	JPL · 11778
11779 Zernike	4197 T-3	Frits Zernike, Dutch physicist, winner of the 1953 Nobel Prize for Physics †	MPC · 11779
11780 Thunder Bay	1942 TB	Thunder Bay, located on the shores of Lake Superior, is the most populous municipality in Northwestern Ontario, Canada. Formed in 1970 as the amalgamation of two cities, Thunder Bay is known as "the Lakehead" because it is Canada's westernmost port on the Great Lakes and the end of Great Lakes Navigation.	JPL · 11780
11781 Alexroberts	1966 PL	Alexander William Roberts, Scottish-South African astronomer	JPL · 11781
11782 Nikolajivanov	1969 TT_{1}	Nikolaj Mikhajlovich Ivanov (born 1937), a specialist in ballistics, is head of the Russian Ballistic Center, which controls missions of crewed and uncrewed spacecraft in near, middle and deep space. He is the author of many scientific articles, monographs and popular scientific brochures.	JPL · 11782
11785 Migaic	1973 AW_{3}	Moscow State University of Geodesy and Cartography (formerly Moscow Institute of Geodesy, Air-Photography and Cartography) is the only educational institution in Russia that trains specialists in geodesy, geodynamics, astronomy, cosmic geodesy and the making of optical and electronic devices.	JPL · 11785
11786 Bakhchivandji	1977 QW	Grigory Bakhchivandzhi (1909–1943) was a Soviet test pilot and pioneer in rocket flights who in 1942 piloted the first flight on the rocket-propelled experimental aircraft BI-1 of Bolkhovitinov and Isaev.	JPL · 11786
11787 Baumanka	1977 QF_{1}	Bauman Moscow Technical University, founded in 1830, is a well-known higher education and research institution in Russia that trains specialists in many branches of technology and science.	JPL · 11787
11788 Nauchnyj	1977 QN_{2}	Nauchnyj, Crimea, Ukraine, created at the same time as the Crimean Astrophysical Observatory in 1945	JPL · 11788
11789 Kempowski	1977 RK	Walter Kempowski (born 1929), one of the most important contemporary German writers.	JPL · 11789
11790 Goode	1978 RU	Philip R. Goode (born 1943), a professor at the New Jersey Institute of Technology and director of Big Bear Solar Observatory.	JPL · 11790
11791 Sofiyavarzar	1978 SH_{7}	Sofiya Mikhajlovna Varzar (1878–1957), an expert on the dynamics of minor planets.	JPL · 11791
11792 Sidorovsky	1978 SX_{7}	Lev Isaevich Sidorovsky (born 1934) is a well-known St. Petersburg journalist whose initiatives on rehabilitation of historical truth and creation of new cultural traditions, in particular the annual celebration of Pushkin's Lyceum Day, have received public recognition.	JPL · 11792
11793 Chujkovia	1978 TH_{7}	Elizaveta Fedorovna Chujkova (1865–1958), mother of twelve children, showed courage in preventing the demolition of a church in her home village of Serebryanye Prudy, not far from Moscow, in the 1930s. Among her descendants are writers and cultural workers.	JPL · 11793
11794 Yokokebukawa	1978 VW_{8}	Yoko Kebukawa (born 1981) is a professor in the Faculty of Engineering of the Yokohama National University who specializes in the cosmochemistry of meteorites.	JPL · 11794
11795 Fredrikbruhn	1979 QM_{1}	Fredrik Bruhn is a specialist in miniaturized multifunctional system architecture for satellites and robotics.	JPL · 11795
11796 Nirenberg	1980 DS_{4}	Louis Nirenberg (1925–2020), a Canadian-American mathematician, is an expert in the theory of differential equations, mathematical physics and functional analysis.	JPL · 11796
11797 Warell	1980 FV_{2}	Johan Warell (born 1970) is well known for his high-resolution imaging and spectroscopy of the planet Mercury with the Swedish solar telescope and the Nordic optical telescope on La Palma.	JPL · 11797
11798 Davidsson	1980 FH_{5}	The Ph.D. work of Björn Davidsson (born 1974) at Uppsala University opened up new insights about the outgassing mechanism and splitting mechanics of cometary nuclei.	JPL · 11798
11799 Lantz	1981 DG_{2}	Cateline Lantz (born 1989) is a postdoctoral researcher at the Massachusetts Institute of Technology whose investigations include the processes of space weathering on carbonaceous asteroids.	JPL · 11799
11800 Carrozzo	1981 DN_{2}	Filippo Giacomo Carrozzo (born 1978) is a researcher at Istituto di Astrofisica e Planetologia Spaziali (IAPS-Rome) whose work includes mineralogical mapping of Vesta and Ceres using Dawn spacecraft data.	JPL · 11800

== 11801–11900 ==
back to top

Named minor planet	Provisional	This minor planet was named for...	Ref; Catalog
11801 Frigeri	1981 EL_{5}	Alessandro Frigeri (born 1973) is a researcher at the Istituto di Astrofisica e Planetologia Spaziali (IAPS-Rome) who has created spectral parameter maps of Vesta using data from the Dawn spacecraft mission.	JPL · 11801
11802 Ivanovski	1981 EP_{12}	Stavro Lambrov Ivanovski (born 1977) is a scientist at Istituto di Astrofisica e Planetologia Spaziali (IAPS-Rome) whose research includes the dynamics of aspherical dust grains in cometary atmospheres.	JPL · 11802
11803 Turrini	1981 ES_{12}	Diego Turrini (born 1979) is a scientist at the Istituto di Astrofisica e Planetologia Spaziali (IAPS-Rome) whose work includes modeling the source of olivine on Vesta as detected by the Dawn spacecraft mission.	JPL · 11803
11804 Zambon	1981 EE_{13}	Francesca Zambon (born 1981) is a researcher at the Istituto di Astrofisica e Planetologia Spaziali (IAPS-Rome) who uses Dawn spacecraft spectral data to map the mineralogy of both Vesta and Ceres.	JPL · 11804
11805 Novaković	1981 EL_{13}	Bojan Novaković (born 1976) is a professor at the University of Belgrade who has performed analyses of asteroid collisional families and their association with active asteroids.	JPL · 11805
11806 Thangjam	1981 EF_{14}	Guneshwar Thangjam (born 1985) is a researcher at the Max-Planck Institute (Göttingen) performing spectral analyses of Vesta's compositional heterogeneity using Dawn spacecraft data.	JPL · 11806
11807 Wannberg	1981 EH_{17}	Asta Pellinen-Wannberg (born 1953) is a Swedish geophysicist and astronomer at Umeå University known for radar observation of meteors. She studies interaction of small meteoroids with the atmosphere using high-power large-aperture radars.	JPL · 11807
11808 Platz	1981 EM_{17}	Thomas Platz (born 1975) is a researcher at the Max Planck Institute and member of the Dawn mission framing camera team studying surface ice deposits on Ceres.	JPL · 11808
11809 Shinnaka	1981 EG_{18}	Yoshiharu Shinnaka (born 1986) is a Japanese astronomer studying the physicochemical evolution of the early solar nebula through measurements of isotopic ratios of molecules in comets.	JPL · 11809
11810 Preusker	1981 EV_{18}	Frank Preusker (born 1975) is a geologist at the German Aerospace Center (DLR-Berlin) whose work includes digital terrain models of both Vesta and Ceres using Dawn spacecraft images.	JPL · 11810
11811 Martinrubin	1981 EH_{19}	Martin Rubin (born 1977) is a researcher at the Physikalisches Institut, Universität Bern (Switzerland) who specializes in the detection of molecules in comets and served as a member of the Rosetta mission team.	JPL · 11811
11812 Dongqiao	1981 EL_{20}	Dong Qiao (born 1979) is a professor at the Beijing Institute of Technology whose work includes target selection and trajectory design for the Chang'e-2 flyby mission of (4179) Toutatis.	JPL · 11812
11813 Ingorichter	1981 EQ_{23}	Ingo Richter (born 1964) is a scientist at the Braunschweig University of Technology (Germany) whose research includes detection and analysis of asteroid magnetic fields and comet solar wind interactions using spacecraft measurements.	JPL · 11813
11814 Schwamb	1981 EW_{26}	Megan E. Schwamb (born 1984), a discoverer of minor planets and scientist at the Gemini Observatory in Hilo, Hawaii, whose research includes the search for TNOs.	JPL · 11814
11815 Viikinkoski	1981 EG_{31}	Matti Viikinkoski (born 1976) is a postdoctoral researcher at the Tampere University of Technology (Finland) who develops mathematical methods and algorithms for asteroid shape and spin modeling.	JPL · 11815
11816 Vasile	1981 EX_{32}	Massimiliano Vasile (born 1970) is a professor at the University of Strathclyde (UK) whose work includes design and optimization of space flight trajectories.	JPL · 11816
11817 Oguri	1981 EQ_{34}	Junko Oguri (born 1977) is a librarian at the National Astronomical Observatory of Japan. She is also a renowned paper cutout artist whose subjects include asteroids and comets.	JPL · 11817
11818 Ulamec	1981 EK_{35}	Stephan Ulamec (born 1966) is a researcher at the German Aerospace Center (DLR-Berlin) who served as the project manager of Philae, the lander carried aboard ESA's Rosetta mission.	JPL · 11818
11819 Millarca	1981 ER_{35}	Millarca Valenzuela (born 1977) is a geologist at the Pontificia Universidad Catolica de Chile, and a specialist in meteorites, undertaking many search expeditions in the Atacama Desert.	JPL · 11819
11820 Mikiyasato	1981 EP_{38}	Mikiya Sato (born 1967) is a Japanese amateur astronomer who studies dust trails of meteor showers, notably the Phoenicids.	JPL · 11820
11821 Coleman	1981 EG_{44}	Paul Henry Ikaika Coleman (1955–2018) was the first Native Hawaiian to earn a doctorate in astrophysics for his study of distant galaxies. He was a passionate advocate for astronomy and was dedicated to increasing Native Hawaiian participation in the sciences. Me ou mau k\={u}puna e Paul e ho`okele aku ai i n\=a moana h\={o}k\={u} \=akea.	JPL · 11821
11823 Christen	1981 VF	Roland W. Christen, an optician and maker of affordable apochromatic refractors at the forefront of mechanical and optical design.	JPL · 11823
11824 Alpaidze	1982 SO_{5}	Galaktion Yeliseyevich Alpaidze, Russian chief of the Plesetsk Cosmodrome (1963–1975)	JPL · 11824
11826 Yurijgromov	1982 UR_{10}	Yurij Iosifovich Gromov, professor of humanities and social sciences at St. Petersburg University.	JPL · 11826
11827 Wasyuzan	1982 VD_{5}	Wasyuzan, a hill commanding a fine view of the Inland Sea, in Kurashiki, Okayama prefecture.	JPL · 11827
11828 Vargha	1984 DZ	Magda Vargha (1931–2010), librarian of Konkoly Observatory, Budapest, was the author of several books on the history of astronomy	JPL · 11828
11829 Tuvikene	1984 EU_{1}	Tõnu Tuvikene (1952–2010) was an Estonian astronomer and staff member of Tartu Observatory who studied variable stars	JPL · 11829
11830 Jessenius	1984 JE	Jan Jesenius, Czech medical doctor	MPC · 11830
11831 Chaple	1984 SF_{3}	Glenn Chaple (b. 1947), an American popularizer of astronomy.	IAU · 11831
11832 Pustylnik	1984 SC_{6}	Izold Pustylnik (1938–2008), native of the Ukrainian city of Odessa, was a staff member of Tartu Observatory who authored numerous scientific publications and served as editor of the Central European Journal of Physics	JPL · 11832
11833 Dixon	1985 RW	Roger Dixon (born 1947) is a staff physicist at the Fermi National Accelerator Laboratory in Batavia, Illinois, and Project Manager for the Cryogenic Dark Matter Search. He is in charge of and teaches in the Saturday morning physics program for high school students.	JPL · 11833
11836 Eileen	1986 CB	Eileen Collins, astronaut, became in Feb. 1995 the first woman to pilot a shuttle mission.	JPL · 11836
11842 Kap'bos	1987 BR_{1}	Kap'bos is a small village, about 20 km east of the city of Antwerp.	JPL · 11842
11844 Ostwald	1987 QW_{2}	Friedrich Wilhelm Ostwald, 19th–20th-century Latvian-German chemist, founder of the Zeitschrift für Physikalische Chemie, Nobelist	JPL · 11844
11846 Verminnen	1987 SE_{3}	Johan Verminnen, Flemish artist and songwriter.	JPL · 11846
11847 Winckelmann	1988 BY_{2}	Johann Joachim Winckelmann, the German art historian.	JPL · 11847
11848 Paullouka	1988 CW_{2}	Vital-Paul Delporte (born 1936) alias Paul Louka, is a Wallonian artist who expresses himself in composing, poetry, songs and painting. Following an encounter with Jacques Brel, he spent three years in Paris, where he performed in cabarets and theaters. He was director of the artists' organization Sabam for several years.	JPL · 11848
11849 Fauvel	1988 CF_{7}	Charles Fauvel, a French aviator.	JPL · 11849
11852 Shoumen	1988 RD	Shoumen University, successfully to develop education in astronomy, largely as a result of contributions by the first discoverer.	JPL · 11852
11853 Runge	1988 RV_{1}	Philipp Otto Runge, German painter and graphic artist.	JPL · 11853
11854 Ludwigrichter	1988 RM_{3}	Adrian Ludwig Richter, German artist.	JPL · 11854
11855 Preller	1988 RS_{3}	Friedrich Preller the Elder, German painter and etcher.	JPL · 11855
11856 Nicolabonev	1988 RM_{8}	Nicola Bonev (1898–1979) was for 40 years the head of the astronomy department at Sofia University and founder and director of the Institute of Astronomy of the Bulgarian Academy of Sciences. He was known for his research in celestial mechanics, theoretical astronomy, solar activity, lunar studies and cosmology	JPL · 11856
11858 Devinpoland	1988 RC_{11}	Devin Patrick Poland (born 1986) is the Mission Operations Manager of the Lucy spacecraft.	IAU · 11858
11859 Danngarcia	1988 SN_{1}	Dann Garcia (born 1977) is the deputy lead of L'SPACE, the "Lucy Student Collaboration" for the Lucy mission.	IAU · 11859
11860 Uedasatoshi	1988 UP	Satoshi Ueda (born 1954) is the astronomical head of the Kagoshima Municipal Science Hall and is also a well-known amateur astronomer. His main activities include a continuous search for supernovae at his private observatory as well as the organizing of local star parties.	JPL · 11860
11861 Teruhime	1988 VY_{2}	Teruhime (1552–1627), wife and supporter of Kuroda Kanbe, who was instrumental in helping Japan end the Age of Civil Wars.	JPL · 11861
11865 Nakamuramasatsug	1989 SC	Masatsugu Nakamura, Japanese amateur astronomer	IAU · 11865
11868 Kleinrichert	1989 TY	Michelle Kleinrichert Binzel (born 1959) is an adjunct professor of business at Bentley College who also raises and trains guide dogs for the blind. She is the wife of the discoverer.	JPL · 11868
11870 Sverige	1989 TC_{3}	Sverige (Sweden) is a nation in northern Europe, located on the Scandinavian peninsula together with Norway.	JPL · 11870
11871 Norge	1989 TP_{7}	Norway (Norge) is a nation in northern Europe, well known for its beautiful coast.	JPL · 11871
11873 Kokuseibi	1989 WS_{2}	"Kokuseibi" is another name for The National Museum of Western Art. It opened in 1959 to introduce Western arts to the Japanese public. The core of the collection was the Matsukata Collection of Impressionist-school paintings and Rodin sculptures.	JPL · 11873
11874 Gringauz	1989 XD_{1}	Konstantin Gringauz (1918–1993) became involved in ionospheric studies early in his career. He participated in the launching of Sputnik 1 by constructing the beep-beep transmitter. During 1982–1986 he was responsible for designing and implementing plasma experiments aboard VEGA 1 and 2.	JPL · 11874
11875 Rhône	1989 YG_{5}	The Rhône, a major river in France, has been an important highway for the transportation of merchandise since the time of the Greeks and Romans. Rising in the Swiss Alps, the river flows through Lake Geneva and the cities of Lyon, Valence and Avignon, reaching the Mediterranean Sea at Marseille after 813 km.	JPL · 11875
11876 Doncarpenter	1990 EM_{1}	For the past 42 years, Don Carpenter (born 1938) has been associated with the Stanford research group devoted to passive and active whistler-mode probing of the earth's ionosphere and magnetosphere. In 1966 he discovered the plasmapause in the electron-density distribution of the magnetosphere.	JPL · 11876
11878 Hanamiyama	1990 HJ	Hanamiyama, Japanese mountain.	JPL · 11878
11881 Mirstation	1990 QO_{6}	The Russian space station Mir, launched in 1986, remained in service for more than 15 years as a laboratory for a wealth of scientific experiments performed on board by international crews.	JPL · 11881
11885 Summanus	1990 SS	Summanus was the Etruscan or Roman deity responsible for nocturnal lightning and thunder, as Jupiter was in daytime. This was the first earth-approacher discovered automatically by software and (lightning-fast) electronic computer; J. V. Scotti used D. L. Rabinowitz's Moving Object Detection Program at the telescope	JPL · 11885
11886 Kraske	1990 TT_{10}	Konrad Kraske (born 1926) served as a member of the supervisory board of the public German TV net ZDF since its foundation in 1962---the last decade as its chairman. Kraske was primarily engaged in the development of highly demanding TV channels. The name was suggested by the first discoverer.	JPL · 11886
11887 Echemmon	1990 TV_{12}	The Trojan hero Echemmon, son of the King Priam, who was killed together with his brother Chromius by Diomedes, king of Argos.	JPL · 11887
11895 Dehant	1991 GU_{3}	Véronique Dehant, head of the section for time, Earth rotation and space geodesy at the Royal Observatory, Uccle. She is currently involved with the NEIGE project, which plans a soft landing of a geodetic instrument on Mars. In 1999 she was awarded the Bomford prize for her work on the earth's nutation.	JPL · 11895
11896 Camelbeeck	1991 GP_{6}	Thierry Camelbeeck (born 1956), a seismologist at the Royal Observatory, Uccle.	JPL · 11896
11897 Lemaire	1991 GC_{7}	Joseph F. Lemaire (born 1939), head of the Fundamental Dynamics section at the Belgian Institute for Space Aeronomy, Uccle.	JPL · 11897
11898 Dedeyn	1991 GM_{9}	Peter Paul De Deyn (born 1957), head of the Laboratory of Neurochemistry and Behavior at the Born-Bunge Foundation of the University of Antwerp.	JPL · 11898
11899 Weill	1991 GJ_{10}	Kurt Weill, German-American composer.	JPL · 11899
11900 Spinoy	1991 LV_{2}	Constant Spinoy (1924–1997) was a famous Belgian artist and engraver who specialised in the design of postage stamps, of which he engraved more than 100. These include Vielsalm, Towers of Ghent and Double astrograph at the Royal Observatory of Uccle. In 1977 he was honored with the Prize of Europe for his Jeugdfilatelie.	JPL · 11900

== 11901–12000 ==
back to top

Named minor planet	Provisional	This minor planet was named for...	Ref; Catalog
11905 Giacometti	1991 VL_{6}	Alberto Giacometti (1901–1966), a Swiss sculptor whose work is often compared to that of the Existentialists, contrasted with the avant-garde in that it attempted to equal reality so that a sculpture, like Observing Head (1927), would be perceived as if it were alive. Other masterpieces are The Palace at 4 a.m. and 1 + 1 = 3.	JPL · 11905
11907 Näränen	1992 ER_{8}	Jyri Näränen (born 1979) is a Finnish astronomer who works on the surface composition and structure of Mercury and the Moon	JPL · 11907
11908 Nicaragua	1992 GC_{5}	Nicaragua is the largest country in the Central American isthmus.	JPL · 11908
11911 Angel	1992 LF	Founder and director of Steward Observatory's mirror lab at the University of Arizona, Tucson, Roger Angel (born 1941) has spearheaded the development of telescope mirrors as large as eight meters in diameter by a process called spin-casting. His work and ideas have resulted in an enormous increase in telescope light-gathering power	JPL · 11911
11912 Piedade	1992 OP_{5}	Serra de Piedade in the Brazilian state of Minas Gerais, east of the capital of Belo Horizonte, is the location of the Piedade Observatory. During the 1970s the discoverer spent many hours there observing variable stars	JPL · 11912
11913 Svarna	1992 RD_{3}	Anneta Svarna (born 1951) is a mathematical logician who works on information theory for the European Union. The author of many publications on mathematical logic, in 1998 she published (with D. Sinachopoulos) an important paper on Greek philosophy: Why Plato was against observational astronomy	JPL · 11913
11914 Sinachopoulos	1992 RZ_{3}	Dimitrios Sinachopoulos (born 1951) is an astrophysicist at the National Observatory of Athens who conducts observational and theoretical work on galactic lenses. In 1991 he wrote (with A. Svarna) The Teachings of Astronomy in Plato's Republic. He has often helped the discoverer with the treatment of CCD frames	JPL · 11914
11915 Nishiinoue	1992 SJ_{1}	Tsuyoshi Nishiinoue (born 1954) studied at the Department of Earth and Planetary Sciences at the Western Australian Museum in 1991. Upon his return to Japan, he became director of Kihoku Observatory, in Kagoshima prefecture, in 1995. He remains a scholar and popularizer of astronomy.	JPL · 11915
11916 Wiesloch	1992 ST_{17}	Wiesloch, a German city in northern Baden-Württemberg. It celebrates the 1200th anniversary of its first documented mention in mid–2001. Situated some 16 km south of the famous Heidelberg-Königstuhl Observatory, it became the home town of the first discoverer more than 30 years ago.	JPL · 11916
11921 Mitamasahiro	1992 UN_{3}	Masahiro Mita (born 1948) is a well-known writer. In 1977 he won the Akutagawa Prize, which is one of the most important prizes in Japan for a novelist	JPL · 11921
11924 Tanakatetuo	1992 WS_{3}	Tetuo Tanaka, Japanese amateur astronomer.	IAU · 11924
11925 Usubae	1992 YA_{1}	Usubae at Cape Ashizuri in western Kochi prefecture is a beautiful beach featuring many strange rock formations. It is a famous spot for fishing and well known as the first place in the Japanese archipelago that the Kuroshio ocean current reaches	JPL · 11925
11926 Orinoco	1992 YM_{2}	The Orinoco, a river in the extreme northern part of South America, has its source in the Parima mountain range on the Venezuelan-Brazilian border. Draining 880~000 km 2 of the Colombian and Venezuelan region, it forms an enormous delta before reaching the Atlantic Ocean near the island of Trinidad	JPL · 11926
11927 Mount Kent	1993 BA	Mount Kent Observatory is a facility for astronomical education, research and outreach operated by the University of Southern Queensland. It provides remote and robotic observing, in partnership with the University of Louisville, the University of Queensland and Automated Patrol Telescopes Australia.	JPL · 11927
11928 Akimotohiro	1993 BT_{2}	Hiroyuki Akimoto (born 1967) is editor-in-chief of the Japanese monthly astronomical magazine Gekkan Tenmon Guide. He has edited many books on astronomy	JPL · 11928
11929 Uchino	1993 BG_{3}	Satoshi Uchino (born 1935), for many years the chief secretary of the Kawasaki Astronomical Association, has greatly contributed to the popularization of astronomy	JPL · 11929
11930 Osamu	1993 CJ_{1}	Oshima Osamu (born 1959) is a leading amateur astronomer and science teacher in Gunma prefecture and volunteer science instructor in great favor with children. His interests in astronomy are wide, currently CCD imaging of planetary nebulae	JPL · 11930
11933 Himuka	1993 ES	Himuka is an old Japanese name for the Miyazaki prefecture region. The name was selected among other candidates proposed by children who attended the Fureai Space Festival, held in Miyazaki city on the 2004 Space Day in Japan	JPL · 11933
11934 Lundgren	1993 FL_{4}	Kjell Lundgren (b.~1950) who has studied red giants in the LMC and the Fornax dwarf galaxy, is now working as an engineer at Uppsala Astronomical Observatory	JPL · 11934
11935 Olakarlsson	1993 FB_{8}	Ola Karlsson (born 1973) has for several years been studying Jupiter Trojans, both by physical observations and by numerical integrations resulting in his thesis A Study of Jupiter Trojans.	JPL · 11935
11936 Tremolizzo	1993 FX_{9}	Elena Tremolizzo (born 1972) is an attitude and orbit control systems engineer at the European Space Agency, involved in the SMART-1 mission to the Moon and the European global navigation satellite system, Galileo.	JPL · 11936
11941 Archinal	1993 KT_{1}	Brent Archinal, American astronomer	MPC · 11941
11942 Guettard	1993 NV	Jean-Étienne Guettard (1715–1786) was a French geologist and mineralogist. From the evidence of fossils found in the volcanic hills of the Puy de Dôme, in south-central France, he concluded correctly that they conflicted with the time scheme of the Old Testament.	JPL · 11942
11943 Davidhartley	1993 OF_{9}	David Hartley (1705–1757) was an English medical doctor and philosopher who attempted to explain how thought processes occur. His major work, Observations on Man, His Frame, His Duty and His Expectations, is important in the history of psychology for suggesting that body and mind function in concert.	JPL · 11943
11944 Shaftesbury	1993 OK_{9}	Anthony Ashley-Cooper, 3rd Earl of Shaftesbury (1671–1713), an English politician, philosopher and writer	MPC · 11944
11945 Amsterdam	1993 PC_{5}	Amsterdam, the Netherlands	JPL · 11945
11946 Bayle	1993 PB_{7}	Pierre Bayle (1647–1706), a French philosopher who wrote the Historical and Critical Dictionary. Because it deliberately tried to destroy orthodox Christian beliefs, he aroused the ire of many of his colleagues. In 1682 he published some reflections on the comet of 1680, deriding the superstition that comets presage catastrophes.	JPL · 11946
11947 Kimclijsters	1993 PK_{7}	Kim Clijsters, Belgian tennis player †	MPC · 11947
11948 Justinehénin	1993 QQ_{4}	Justine Hénin-Hardenne, Belgian tennis player †	MPC · 11948
11949 Kagayayutaka	1993 SD_{2}	Yutaka Kagaya (born 1968) is a well-known Japanese space artist who received the gold medal in the American Digital Art Contest in 2000	JPL · 11949
11950 Morellet	1993 SG_{5}	André Morellet (1727–1819), a French economist, philosopher, and writer, left his Mémoires sur le XVIIIesiècle et la Révolution (1821), a precious document about the eighteenth century. Besides several articles for Diderot's Encyclopédie, he refuted, in 1770, Galiani's Dialogues sur le commerce des blés.	JPL · 11950
11951 Marcoschioppa	1994 AJ_{3}	Marco Schioppa, Italian professor of experimental physics at the University of Calabria and director of High Energy Laboratory.	IAU · 11951
11955 Russrobb	1994 CA_{1}	Russell M. Robb (born 1952), astronomer at the University of Victoria, played the leading role in automating the university's 0.5-m telescope and equipping it with a CCD camera. The telescope has been used extensively in the university's observational programs, including astrometric work on comets and minor planets.	JPL · 11955
11956 Tamarakate	1994 CL_{14}	Tamara Kate Peiser (born 2001) is the second daughter of Gillian and Benny Peiser. Her father, an anthropologist at Liverpool John Moores University, is known the world over for the Cambridge Conference network	JPL · 11956
11958 Galiani	1994 EJ_{7}	Abbé Ferdinando Galiani (1728–1787), secretary at the Neapolitan Embassy in Paris from 1759 to 1769, is well known for his witty Dialogues sur le commerce des blés (1768), in which he attacked the doctrine of free market of the physiocrates. He was much esteemed by d´Holbach	JPL · 11958
11959 Okunokeno	1994 GG_{1}	Keno Okuno (born 1932), an amateur astronomer and a member of the Kawasaki Astronomical Association, has greatly contributed to the popularization of astronomy	JPL · 11959
11963 Ignace	1994 PO_{16}	Ignace Van der Gucht (born 1959) is a graduate in electronics and chief of construction at the Royal Observatory at Uccle, where he places his abilities at the disposal of his colleagues, particularly when they have problems with configuring and upgrading their computers	JPL · 11963
11964 Prigogine	1994 PY_{17}	Ilya Prigogine (1917–2003), a Belgian-Russian chemist who was honored with the 1977 Nobel Prize in chemistry for his work on non-equilibrium thermodynamics. He was born in Moscow, he moved to Belgium in 1929, where he studied and worked at the Université Libre de Bruxelles, especially on dissipative structures.	JPL · 11964
11965 Catullus	1994 PF_{20}	Catullus (c. 84–54 BCE), a Latin poet of the late Roman Republic, whose work focused on personal life rather than classical heroes.	JPL · 11965
11966 Plateau	1994 PJ_{20}	Joseph Antoine Ferdinand Plateau (1801–1883) was a Belgian physicist who stated the so-called "Plateau-problem". The proof of the existence of a minimal surface (of least area) bounded by a simple closed curve in space was solved in 1930 by means of variational analysis	JPL · 11966
11967 Boyle	1994 PW_{20}	Robert Boyle (1627–1691) was an Anglo-Irish physicist and philosopher well known for his experiments with gases, leading to the discovery that the volume of a gas is inversely proportional to its pressure. In 1661 he developed the concept of primary particles (the critical chymist).	JPL · 11967
11968 Demariotte	1994 PR_{27}	Edmé de Mariotte (1620–1684) was a French physicist who discovered independently of Boyle that the volume of a gas varies inversely with pressure. He proposed the word "barometer" for the instrument measuring the pressure of air and stated that Boyle's law holds only if there is no change in temperature	JPL · 11968
11969 Gay-Lussac	1994 PC_{37}	Joseph Louis Gay-Lussac (1778–1850) was a French chemist and physicist, one of the founders of meteorology. In 1802 he showed that all gases expand by the same fraction of their volume with temperature. However, he is primarily known for his law stating that "gases combine in very simple proportions".	JPL · 11969
11970 Palitzsch	1994 TD	Johann Georg Palitzsch (1723–1788) was a German farmer by profession and an astronomer by vocation. He recovered comet 1P/Halley on its first predicted return in 1758 and observed further comets, as well as variable stars such as Mira and Algol. The citation was prepared by P. Brosche.	JPL · 11970
11974 Yasuhidefujita	1994 YF	Yasuhide Fujita (born 1961) is a Japanese amateur astronomer and discoverer of minor planets. He is a staff member at the Board of Education in Kuma Town. He worked as a researcher at the Kuma Kogen Astronomical Observatory for eight years (1992–1999) and independently discovered the supernova 1994I.	JPL · 11974
11976 Josephthurn	1995 JG	Count Joseph Thurn (1761–1831), an admiral in the Borbonic fleet, was in command of the Austrian emperor's troops. He spent part of his life in Gorizia, where in 1831 was founded the Monte di Pietá and Cassa di Risparmio	JPL · 11976
11977 Leonrisoldi	1995 OA	Leon Risoldi (born 2009), the first grandson of one of the discoverers at Santa Lucia observatory.	JPL · 11977
11978 Makotomasako	1995 SS_{4}	Makoto Shima (born 1923) and his wife Masako Shima (born 1930) are both experts in the study of meteorites. Makoto published many books on meteorites and cosmic dust, and Masako's specialties are the chemical composition and origin of meteorites, especially the analysis of cosmic-ray-produced nuclides	JPL · 11978
11980 Ellis	1995 SP_{8}	Kerry Ellis (born 1965) a Canadian physicist, wrote a thesis at the University of Western Ontario in electrical engineering and specialized in meteor burst communication.	JPL · 11980
11981 Boncompagni	1995 UY_{1}	Baldassarre Boncompagni (1821–1894) was an Italian aristocrat, historian of mathematics, and editor of 20 volumes of Bullettino di Bibliografia e Storia delle Scienze Matematiche e fisiche. This monumental work, published in Rome during 1868–1887, was fundamental in the history of the mathematical and physical sciences, with many articles on the history of astronomy.	JPL · 11981
11984 Manet	1995 UK_{45}	Édouard Manet (1832–1883), a French painter who was a pivotal figure in the transition of realism to impressionism. He is well known for his The Luncheon on the Grass (1863), Olympia (1863) and Folies-Bergère (1882)	JPL · 11984
11987 Yonematsu	1995 VU_{1}	Yonematsu Shiono (born 1947) is an investigator of traditional life in Japan and has published many articles and books on it. He also published many books on outdoor life, including astronomical observations	JPL · 11987
11997 Fassel	1995 YU_{9}	Deborah Elizabeth Fassel (born 1950) and Charles Sebastian Fassel (born 1955) are Canadian amateur astronomers who live in St. Catharines, Ontario.	MPC · 11997
11998 Fermilab	1996 AG_{7}	Fermi National Accelerator Laboratory, USA	MPC · 11998

back to top

Preceded by 10,001–11,000	Meanings of minor-planet names List of minor planets: 11,001–12,000	Succeeded by 12,001–13,000
