= 11714 Mikebrown =

Stony background asteroid from the central region of the asteroid belt

Discovery
- Discovered by: LONEOS
- Discovery site: Anderson Mesa Stn.
- Discovery date: 28 April 1998

Designations
- Named after: Michael E. Brown (minor planet discoverer)
- Alternative designations: 1998 HQ_{51} · 1977 RX_{8} 1986 TH_{5} · 1986 TW_{10} 1986 UR_{1}
- Minor planet category: main-belt · (central) background

Orbital characteristics
- Epoch 4 September 2017 (JD 2458000.5)
- Uncertainty parameter 0
- Observation arc: 38.94 yr (14,224 days)
- Aphelion: 3.3555 AU
- Perihelion: 1.9897 AU
- Semi-major axis: 2.6726 AU
- Eccentricity: 0.2555
- Orbital period (sidereal): 4.37 yr (1,596 days)
- Mean anomaly: 67.558°
- Mean motion: 0° 13^{m} 32.16^{s} / day
- Inclination: 3.0156°
- Longitude of ascending node: 178.73°
- Argument of perihelion: 135.17°

Physical characteristics
- Mean diameter: 4.451±0.945 km
- Geometric albedo: 0.246±0.069
- Absolute magnitude (H): 14.1

11714 Mikebrown, provisional designation 1998 HQ_{51}, is a stony background asteroid from the central region of the asteroid belt, approximately 4.5 kilometers (2.8 miles) in diameter. It was discovered on 28 April 1998, by astronomers of the Lowell Observatory Near-Earth Object Search (LONEOS) at the U.S. Anderson Mesa Station near Flagstaff, Arizona, and later named after American astronomer Michael Brown.

== Orbit and classification ==
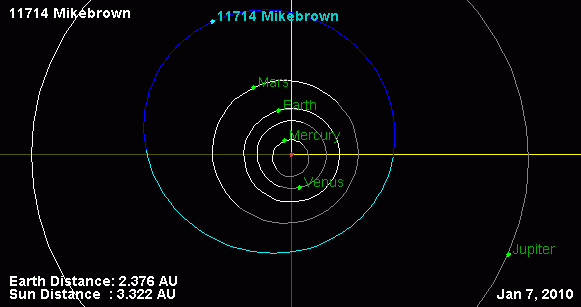
In January 2010, Mikebrown came to opposition with Mercury, Earth, and Mars.

Mikebrown is a non-family asteroid from the main belt's background population. It orbits the Sun in the central main-belt at a distance of 2.0–3.4 AU once every 4 years and 4 months (1,596 days). Its orbit has an eccentricity of 0.26 and an inclination of 3° with respect to the ecliptic.

On 15 May 2012, Mikebrown came within about 14.8 Gm (0.099 AU) of asteroid 625 Xenia.

It was first observed as 1977 RX_{8} Palomar Observatory in 1977, extending the body's observation arc by 21 years prior to its official discovery observation at Anderson Mesa.

== Naming ==
This minor planet was named after American astronomer Michael E. Brown (born 1965), a professor of astronomy at Caltech in California, and best known for his discoveries of trans-Neptunian objects, in particular the dwarf planet 136199 Eris. The official naming citation was published on 24 July 2002 (M.P.C. 46104).

== Physical characteristics ==
According to the survey carried out by NASA's Wide-field Infrared Survey Explorer with its subsequent NEOWISE mission, Mikebrown measures 4.451 kilometers in diameter and its surface has an albedo of 0.246, which is typical for stony S-type asteroids.

It has an absolute magnitude of 14.1. As of 2017, no rotational lightcurve of Mikebrown has been obtained from photometric observations, and the body's rotation period and shape remains unknown.
