= PSR J0659+1414 =

Pulsar in the constellation Gemini

Observation data Epoch J2000 Equinox J2000
- Constellation: Gemini
- Right ascension: 06^{h} 59^{m} 46.196^{s}
- Declination: +14° 14′ 19.40″
- Apparent magnitude (V): 24.90

Characteristics
- Evolutionary stage: Pulsar

Astrometry
Proper motion (μ)	RA: 44.07±0.63 mas/yr Dec.: −2.40±0.29 mas/yr
Parallax (π)	3.47±0.36 mas
Distance	approx. 940 ly (approx. 290 pc)

Details
Rotation	0.384928623365 s
Age	111,000 years

Other designations
- Monogem Pulsar, PSR B0656+14

Database references
SIMBAD	data

PSR J0659+1414 is a pulsar. It produces single peaked pulsed gamma rays. A rotation period of 0.3849 seconds and is characteristic age of 111,000 years old.
