= Pio Emanuelli =

Italian astronomer and historian

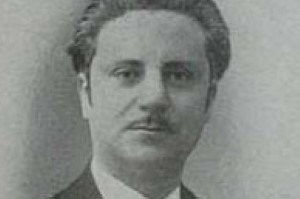
Pio Emanuelli

Pio Emanuelli (3 November 1889 – 2 July 1946) was an Italian astronomer, historian and popularizer of astronomy. He worked for many years at the Vatican Observatory and also taught at the University of Rome.

Emanuelli was born in Rome, son of a Vatican clerk. He was only ten when his father died and took an interest in astronomy from a very young age, attending lectures by Elia Millosevich, writing articles in magazines and newspapers. Even as young boy he was in correspondence with astronomers like Giovanni Schiaparelli and Camille Flammarion. In 1910 he joined the Vatican Observatory under Father Johann Georg Hagen and worked on the Star Catalog for years except for a break due to conscription into the war between 1915 and 1919. In 1922 he became a lecturer in astronomy at the University of Rome and in 1938 he became a professor of the history of astronomy. He wrote numerous popular articles and books. He served as secretary to the Italian Astronomical Society between 1924 and 1928 and was a corresponding member of the Pontifical Academy of the Nuovi Lincei from 1925. In 1940 he was appointed back on army duty at the meteorological station of Vigna di Valle (near Bracciano) with the rank of major but he continued to teach.

Emanuelli died unexpectedly from an illness, leaving behind a large number of incomplete and unpublished works which are now held at the Domus Galileana in Pisa. The asteroid 11145 Emanuelli was named in his memory in 1997. A street in Rome is also named after him.
