= Kumotori =

Kumotori may refer to:

- Mount Kumotori, a mountain at the boundary of Tokyo, Saitama, and Yamanashi Prefectures, Japan
- 11133 Kumotori, a main-belt asteroid
