= Grade (climbing) =

Degree of difficulty of a climbing route

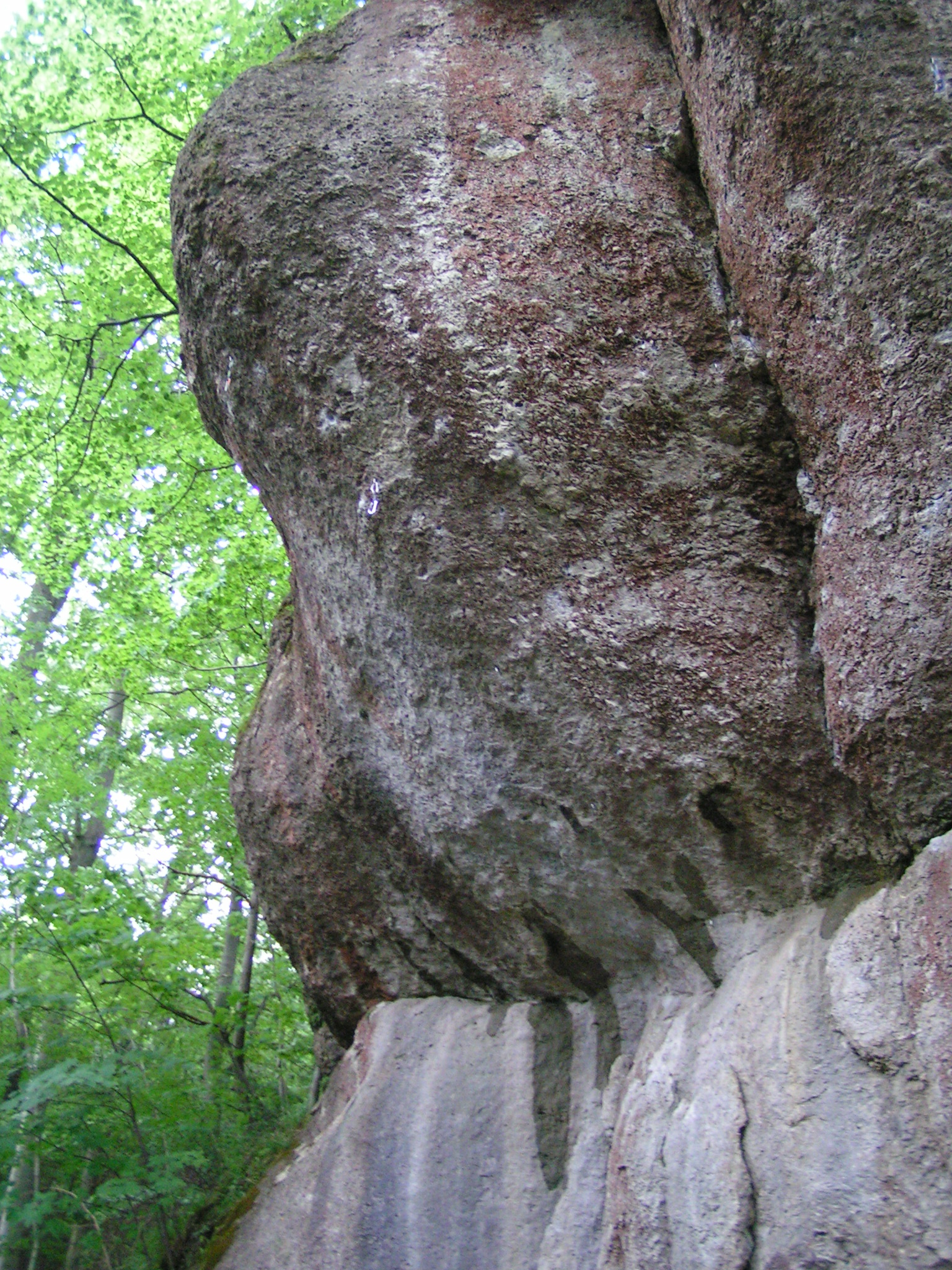
Action Directe was a major milestone in free climbing grades when Wolfgang Güllich freed it in 1991 at 9a (French), 5.14d (American YDS), XI (UIAA).

Many climbing routes have grades to calibrate the technical difficulty, and in some cases the risks, of the route to the climber. The first ascensionist can suggest a grade but it will be amended for the 'consensus view' of subsequent ascents. While many countries with a tradition of climbing developed their own grading systems, a small number of grading systems have become internationally dominant for each type of climbing, and which has led to the standardization of grading worldwide. Over the years, grades have consistently risen in all forms of climbing, helped by improvements in climbing technique and equipment.

In free climbing (i.e. climbing rock routes with no aid), the most popular grading systems are the French numerical or sport system (e.g. 7c+), the American YDS system (e.g. 5.13a), and latterly the UIAA scale (e.g. IX+). These systems solely grade the technical difficulty and are used for the lower-risk activity of sport climbing. The American system adds an R/X suffix to calibrate the additional risks of traditional climbing routes. Notable traditional grading-systems include the British E-grade system (e.g. E4 6a).

In bouldering (i.e. rock climbing on short routes), the popular systems are the American V-scale (or "Hueco") system (e.g. V14), and the French "Font" system (e.g. 8C+). The Font system often attaches an "F" prefix to further distinguish it from French sport climbing grades, which itself uses an "f" prefix (e.g. F8C+ vs. f8c+). It is increasingly common for sport-climbing rock-routes to describe their hardest technical movements in terms of their boulder grade (e.g. an f7a sport climbing route being described as having a V6 crux).

In aid climbing (i.e. the opposite of free climbing), the most widely used system is the A-grade system (e.g. A3+), which was recalibrated in the 1990s as the "new wave" system from the legacy A-grade system. For "clean aid climbing" (i.e. aid climbing equipment is used but only where the equipment is temporary and not permanently hammered into the rock), the most common system is the C-system (e.g. C3+). Aid climbing grades take time to stabilize as successive repeats of aid climbing routes can materially reduce the grade.

In ice climbing, the most widely used grading system is the WI ("water ice") system (e.g. WI6) and the identical AI ("alpine ice") system (e.g. AI6). The related sport of mixed climbing (i.e. ice and dry-tool climbing) uses the M-grade system (e.g. M8), with other notable mixed grading systems including the Scottish Winter system (e.g. Grade VII). Pure dry-tooling routes (i.e. ice tools with no ice) use the D-grade prefix (e.g. D8 instead of M8).

In mountaineering and alpine climbing, the complexity of the routes requires several grades to reflect the difficulties of the various rock, ice, and mixed climbing challenges. The International French Adjectival System (IFAS, e.g.TD+) – which is identical to the "UIAA Scale of Overall Difficulty" (e.g. I–VI) – is used to grade the 'overall' risk and difficulty of mountain routes (with the gradient of the snow/ice fields). For example, the 1938 Heckmair Route on the Eiger is graded: ED2 (IFAS), VI− (UIAA), A0 (A-grade), WI4 (WI-grade), 60° slope. Related 'commitment grade' systems include the American National Climbing Classification System (e.g. I–VII).

== History ==
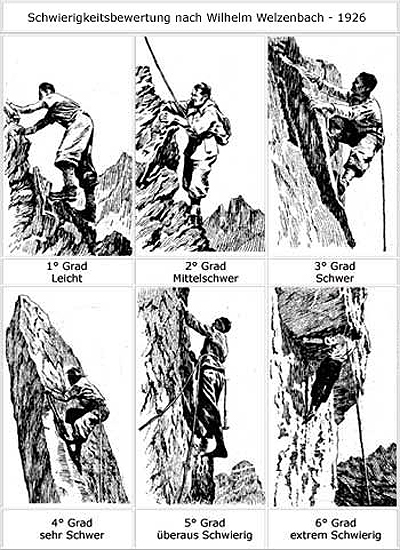
The six levels (Grade I–VI) of the "Welzenbach scale", from 1926

In 1894, the Austrian mountaineer Fritz Benesch introduced the first known climbing grading system, which he introduced to rock climbing. The "Benesch scale" had seven levels of difficulty, with level VII the easiest and level I the hardest; as more difficult climbs were made, the grades of level 0 and level 00 were added.

In 1923, German mountaineer Willo Welzenbach compressed the scale and reversed the order so level 00 became level IV–V, and it became popular in the Alps. In 1967, the "Welzenbach scale" formally became the "UIAA scale" for rock climbing (or "UIAA Scale of Difficulty") with Roman numerals I–VI, and a "+" and "−" to refine each level. The UIAA also incorporated proposals made in 1943 by Lucien Devies and the Groupe de Haute Montagne on a broader "Scale of Global Assessment" for alpine climbing (the French Alpine System), and created the "UIAA Scale of Overall Difficulty" by assigning Roman numerals I–VI to the six adjectival levels (e.g. F, PD, AD, D, TD, and ED) of the French system. The UIAA also incorporated a "Scale of Difficulty in Aided Climbing" for aid routes with the levels A1, A2, A3, and A4 (the UIAA would later add A0 and A5 levels). In 1978, the UIAA added the VII (seventh grade) to its "UIAA scale", implying that the scale was open-ended, a concept formally adopted in 1985.

By the 1980s, French guides had customized the "UIAA scale" beyond V+ with the letters "a", "b", and c" (e.g. V+, VIa, VIb, etc.). At the end of the 1980s, French climbing guidebook author Francois Labande published the "French numerical scale", replacing the UIAA Roman numerals with Arabic numerals, where French 6a equaled UIAA VI+. The two scales were labelled "Plaisir Grades" and aligned in a UIAA table where French grades 1–6a aligned with "UIAA scale" grades I–VI+; beyond that level, the two systems diverged (e.g. French 7a+ equates to UIAA grade VIII and French 9a equates to UIAA grade XI).

In America, a version of the Welzenbach Scale was introduced for rock climbing in 1937 by the Sierra Club, which in the 1950s was further adapted into the Yosemite Decimal System that added a decimal place to the class 5 grade (e.g. 5.2, 5.3, 5.4, etc.), and which by the 1960s was again amended to introduce the letters "a", "b", "c", and "d" after 5.9 to further refine the levels (e.g. 5.9, 5.10a, 5.10b, 5.10c, etc.).

While individual countries developed their own rock climbing grading systems, the American system, French system, and latterly the "UIAA scale" became popular internationally (with the American and French dominating sport climbing). The UIAA "Scale of Overall Assessment" dropped its six Roman numerals in favor of the six adjectival grades of the French Alpine System (to avoid confusion with the "UIAA scale") and dominated alpine climbing grading, while the UIAA "Scale of Difficulty in Aided Climbing" – amended and expanded in Yosemite in the 1990s as "new-wave" grades – dominated aid grading.

== Free climbing ==
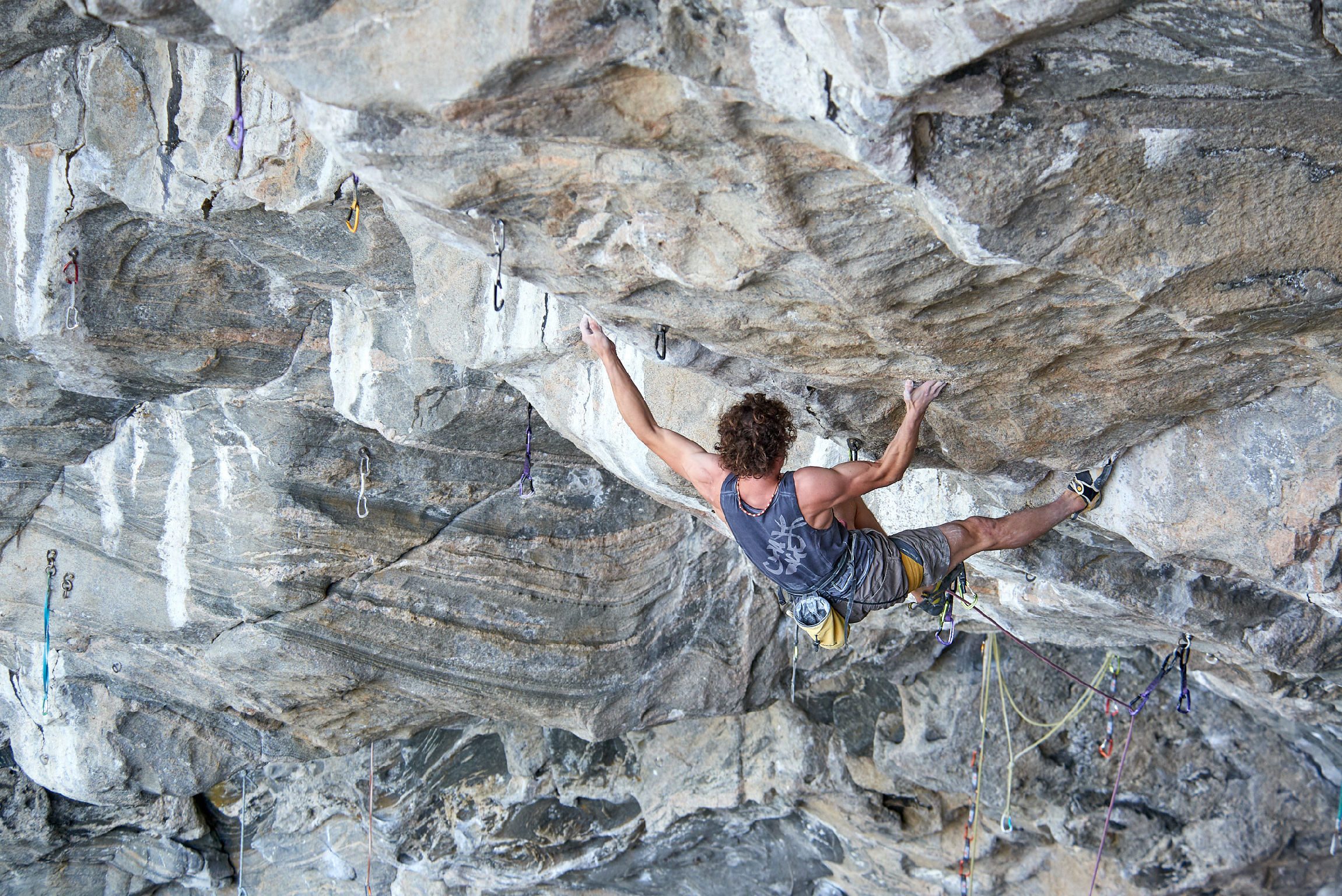
Adam Ondra on the sport climbing route Silence, one of the hardest free climbing routes in the world and the first-ever proposed at 9c (French), 5.15d (American YDS), and XII+ (UIAA).

Free climbing is a form of rock climbing in which the climber can use their rock-climbing equipment only for their protection, not as an artificial aid to help them in ascending a climbing route. The two main free climbing grading systems (which include the two main free climbing disciplines of sport climbing and traditional climbing) are the "French numerical system" and the "American YDS system". The "UIAA scale" is still popular in Germany and across parts of Central Europe. Many countries with a history of free climbing have also developed their own free climbing grading systems including the British E-grade system and the Australia/New Zealand "Ewbank" system.

The evolution of grade milestones in traditional climbing, and latterly sport climbing (as it took over from traditional climbing as the main focus of the leading free climbers), is an important part of the history of rock climbing. As of October 2026, the hardest free climbs in the world are the handful of sport climbing routes graded at 9c (French), 5.15d (American YDS), and XII+ (UIAA), and only one has been repeated and thus its grade confirmed, which was DNA that had its second ascent by Jakob Schubert in October 2026.

=== French numerical grade ===
The French numerical system for free climbing was developed from the UIAA scale in the 1980s but uses Arabic numbers instead of the UIAA scale's Roman numerals, and also uses the letters "a", "b" and "c" and the "+" symbol to give additional refinement between the numbers (whereas the UIAA uses only the "−" and "+" symbols). The French system starts at 1 and closely aligns with the UIAA scale up to UIAA V+, which is French grade 5a, but thereafter begins to diverge. The French grading system is the dominant system in Europe, and it and the American YDS system are the most dominant systems worldwide; beyond the easiest grades, the two systems can be almost exactly aligned in comparison tables.

The French system is an open-ended scale that was at 9c in 2026 with Silence and a handful of others. The system is focused on the overall technical demands of the route, however, on routes where options would enable the climber to avoid harder sections, a split grade is quoted to differenciate between the "obligatory" difficulties faced that can't be avoided, such as 7a (6b obl.). Unlike the American YDS system, there is no allowance for any risks, and thus the French system is more closely aligned with sport climbing, where pre-bolted protection removes the risk. It is less common to find traditional climbing routes graded by the French system, and thus it is also called the French sport grade. To avoid confusion between French grades and the British E-grades, a lowercase "f" (for French) is used as a prefix (e.g. f6a+); this should not be confused with the use of the capitalized "F" or "fb" prefix in Font boulder grades.

=== American YDS grade ===
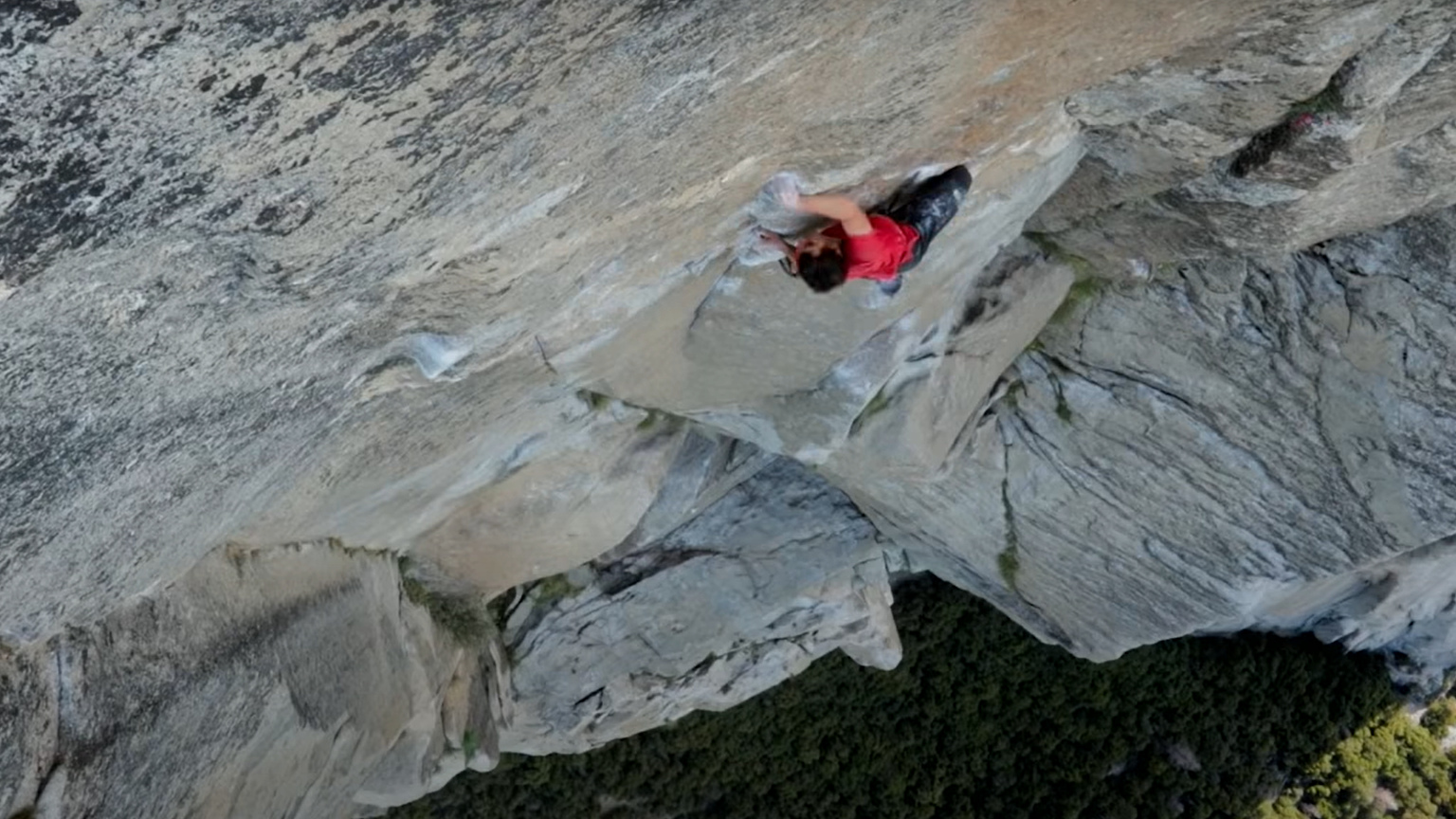
Alex Honnold's 2017 free solo of Freerider on El Capitan was the first-ever big-wall free solo at the grade of 5.13a (American) or 7c+ (French).

The American YDS (or 'Yosemite Decimal System') was developed independently by climbers at Tahquitz Peak who adapted the class 5 rating of Sierra Club Class 1–5 system in the 1950s. The class 5 portion of the class scale is a rock climbing classification system, while classes 1–4 are used for hiking and scrambling. Climbers use class "5" as a prefix, which is then followed by a period and a number that starts at 1 and counts up with increasing difficulty (e.g. 5.4, 5.5, 5.6, etc.). At 5.10, the system adds the letters "a", "b", "c", and "d" as further refinements between levels, and the scale continues upward (e.g. 5.10a, 5.10b, 5.10c, 5.10d, 5.11a, 5.11b, etc.,). The American YDS system is the dominant system in North America, and it and the French numerical system are the most dominant systems worldwide; beyond the easiest grades, they can be exactly aligned.

The American YDS system is an open-ended scale, with the current hardest climbs in 2026 being at 5.15d, established by Silence in 2017. The numerical component of the American YDS system is focused on the hardest move on the route. In 1980, Jim Erickson introduced an additional rating for traditional climbing routes where the level and quality of the climbing protection are assessed. A suffix of "PG-13" (using the American cinema classification system) denotes the climbing protection is adequate, and if properly placed a fall will be short (in practice, the "PG-13" is usually omitted as it is considered the default). A suffix of "R" is added where protection is inadequate and any fall could risk serious injury, and "X" for routes with little or no protection and where any fall could be very long and potentially fatal (also known as a "chop route").

American big wall climbing routes will often include the NCCS grade (Levels I–VII) with the YDS grade (e.g. the Salathé Wall at 5.13b VI).

=== UIAA scale ===
The UIAA scale (or UIAA Scale of Difficulty) for free climbing was developed from the original "Welzenbach scale" in 1967 and uses the Roman numerals of that scale with "+" and "−" symbols for refinement between numerals after Grade III (i.e. III, IV−, IV, IV+, V−, V, V+ etc.,). Initially, the UIAA scale was closed-ended and went from Grade I (easiest) up to Grade VI (hardest), where it stopped. In 1978, the "seventh grade" was added—though climbers had been climbing at that level for years—and by 1985 it was formally made into an open-ended scale that went beyond Grade VII.

The UIAA scale is closely aligned with the French system up to Grade V+, which is French grade 5a, but thereafter begins to diverge, although the two can be reasonably aligned in comparison tables. The UIAA scale was at XII+ in 2026 with Silence, which is French 9c. While the French system became the dominant scale in Europe, the UIAA scale is still popular in Germany, Austria, Switzerland, Czech Republic, Slovakia, and Hungary. The UIAA scale is also commonly found in the grading systems of alpine climbing routes, and particularly those that use the French Alpine System (e.g. PD, D, TD, ED), where the UIAA scale is often used to grade the free climbing component.

=== British E-grade ===
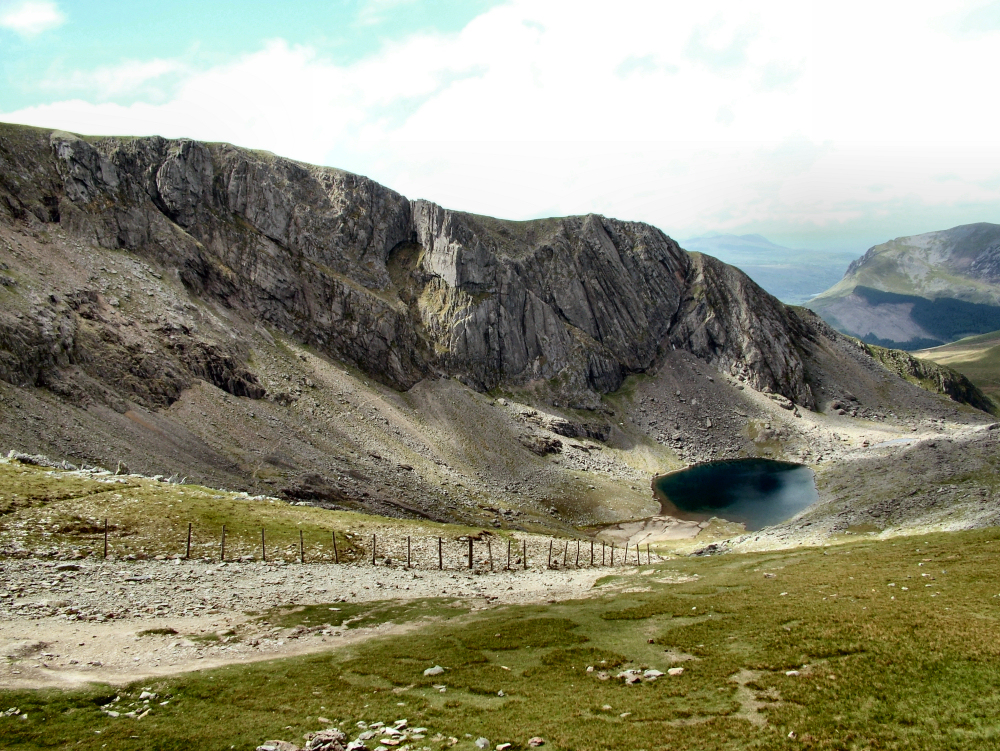
The crag of Clogwyn Du'r Arddu in Wales with Indian Face (centre), which was the first-ever E9-graded route on the British system at E9 6c (British) or 5.13a X (American)

The most complex grading system is the British E-grade system (or British trad grade), which uses two separate open-ended grades for each route. This structure is particularly adapted to traditional climbing routes (which are more common in Britain), but it is still considered complex and unlike the American YDS system (which has the R/X labels for traditional climbing routes), never came into wider use for traditional climbing outside of Britain. Within Britain, the French sport grade is more popular for British bolted sport climbing routes. As of April 2026, the highest consensus E-grade on a traditional route in Britain was on Lexicon (E11 7a) and on Rhapsody (E11 7a), which are equivalent to American 5.14 R or French f8b+/f8c+. Outside of Britain, the highest E-grade was Bon Voyage in France at E12, or 5.14d / 9a.

The first grade is an "adjectival grade" that covers the overall difficulty of the route and takes into account the: "seriousness, how sustained it is, technical difficulty, exposure, strenuousness, rock quality, and any other less tangible aspects which lend difficulty to a pitch". This adjectival grade uses the labels (starting from the easiest): M (moderate), D (difficult), VD (very difficult), HVD (hard very difficult), S (severe), HS (hard severe), VS (very severe), and HVS (hard very severe). After HVS, the label switches to E (extreme), but then rises as E1, E2, E3, E4, ... etc., in an open-ended scale.

The second grade is a "technical grade" that focuses on the hardest technical movement on the route. This technical grade has a very similar format to the French sport grade, being an Arabic number that starts at 4 and uses the additional "a", "b", and "c" symbols for refinement between the numbers (unlike the French grades, it does not use the "+" refinement, and simply goes: 4a, 4b, 4c, 5a, 5b, 5c, 6a, ... etc.). British climbers use the prefix "f" to distinguish French sport-grades from British technical grades, which is important as they are not equivalent (e.g. British 5c is f6b+).

The key to understanding the British E-grade system is the relationship between the two grades. For each adjectival grade there is a typical technical grade for a standard route. For example, E4 is often associated with 6a, so E4 6a means that the route has a normal level of risk and other related factors for its technical level of 6a. E5 6a indicates that the risk is higher (i.e., closer to an American YDS "R"), while E6 6a indicates a very significant risk (like the American YDS R/X), and a rare E7 6a means effectively no protection (similar to a full American YDS "X" or essentially a free solo route). Similarly, E3 6a is a well-protected route, while E2 or E1 6a means easily available bomb-proof protection.

=== Other notable systems ===
- German/Swiss Saxon scale (or Dresden scale, or East German scale). Developed at the start of the 20th century for the emerging Saxon Switzerland climbing region, it was gradually adopted by other climbing areas in the region, such as Bohemian Switzerland, Bohemian Paradise, Lusatian Mountains, and the Zittau Mountains. While it uses Roman numerals, it is a separate system from the UIAA scale. As well as Roman numerals, the Saxon grades use the symbols "a", "b" and "c" for further refinement between numerals from grade VII onwards. Unlike the American YDS and French sport systems, the Saxon grading system is not purely focused on technical difficulties but is also based on "route length, the total psychological commitment, the placements distance, the risk, [and] the random stops"; it is thus not directly comparable to other systems.

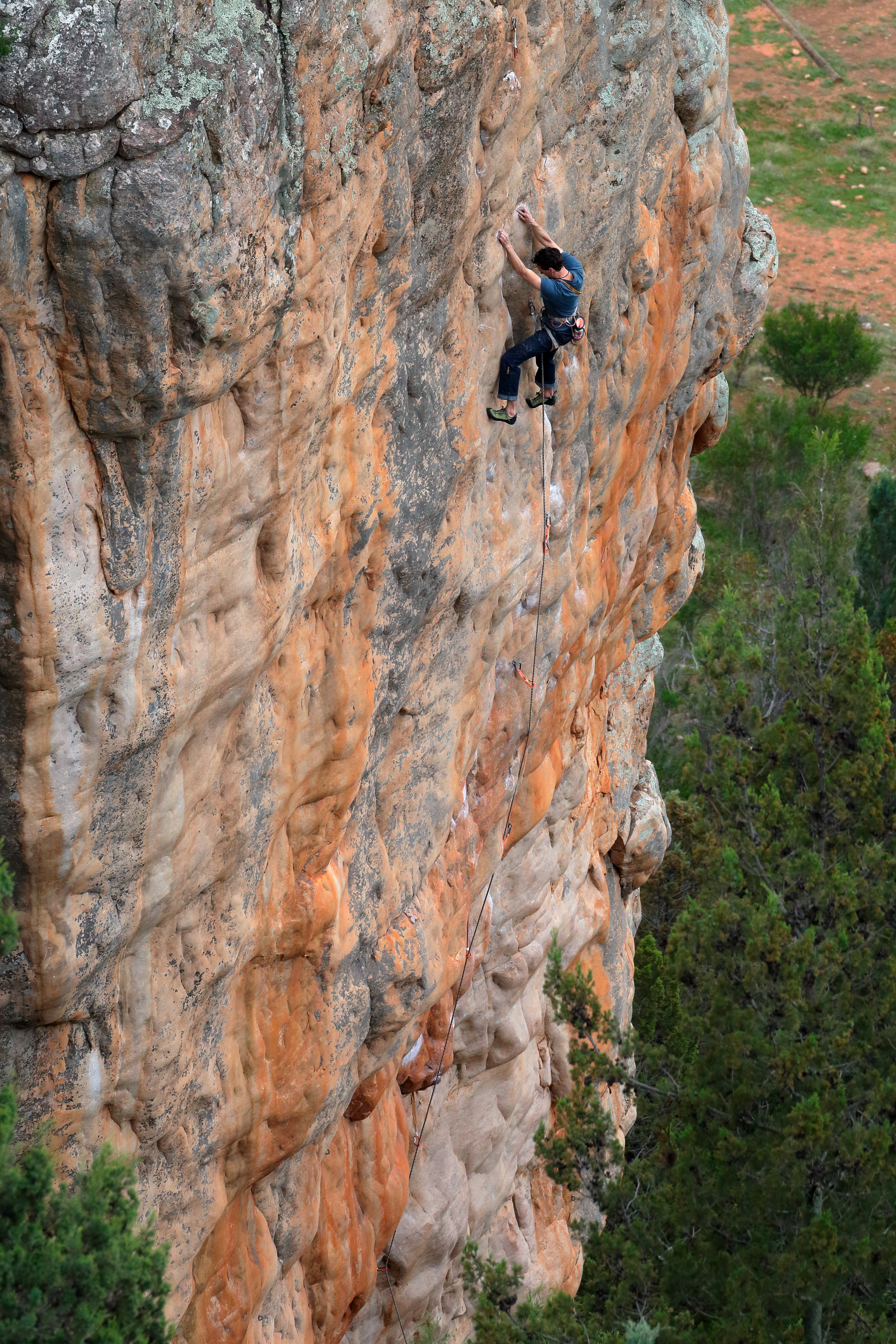
Climber on Punks in the Gym, Mount Arapiles, grade 32 (Ewbank) and the world's first-ever 8b+ (French), 5.14a (American) route

- Australia/New Zealand/South African Ewbank system. In 1967, Australian climber John Ewbank created his scale as an alternative to the British E-grade, and it became the dominant system for Australia and New Zealand, and latterly South Africa (with local variations). The system is open-ended, uses only Arabic numerals (with no "a", "b", "c" or "+" and "−" refinements), starts at 1 (easiest), and continues upward. Unlike many other systems (e.g. American YDS and French sport), the Ewbank system is not solely based on the hardest technical movement on the route but also takes into account the exposure, length, quality of rock, availability of protection, and other factors. Thus, a dangerous route with easier technical climbing might get the same grade as a safe route but with harder technical climbing. The system relies on the climbing guidebook, or word of mouth, to clarify the factors that influenced the grade. For the strongest modern sport climbing routes, the Ewbank grade is largely a technical grade.
- Scandinavian. Norway, Finland, and Sweden have scales that are numerically different (i.e., they don't align exactly) but they are similar enough to align in comparison tables. All their scales are open-ended, use Arabic numerals, and use "+" and "−" symbols for additional refinement between the numerals (e.g., −4, 4, 4+, −5, 5, 5+, 6−, 6, etc.). Originally, the Scandinavian countries used the UIAA scale, but its closed-end status at VI (up until 1985) led them to create their own systems that align closely to the UIAA scale, particularly to grade IV. While the UIAA scale is still used in Scandinavian countries, the French sport grade is now more common for sport-climbing routes.
- Brazilian technical scale. Brazilian climbing has two grades, the first being a numerical grade from 1 (easiest) to 8 (hardest) that indicates the "overall" level of difficulty (akin to the UIAA Scale of Overall Difficulty). The second, the technical grade, which is the most often used, defines the technical difficulty of the hardest movement (or sequences of movements) and is an open-ended scale that starts with Roman numerals (and a "sup." for additional refinement between numerals), up to VIsup., which is roughly VII+ (UIAA) f6b+ (French) or 5.10d (American). After VIsup., the system moves to Arabic numerals, starting at 7, and using the symbols "a", "b", and "c" for additional refinement between numerals (e.g. VI, VIsup, 7a, 7b, 7c, 8a, etc.).
- Polish Cracow scale (or Kurtyka's scale). Up until the 1970s, the UIAA scale was used in the limestone climbing areas near Kraków, where Polish sport climbing was developed, with Grade I (easiest) to Grade VI (hardest). As the climbing level grew, the UIAA scale became inadequate. Polish climber and alpinist Wojciech Kurtyka proposed an extension to the scale. Easier routes were described by the UIAA scale, and harder routes above Grade VI+ used Arabic numerals with a "+" refinement, so that after Grade VI+ came the new grades of: VI.1, VI.1+, VI.2, VI.2+, and so on.
- Deep-water soloing grades. A number of systems have been used to assign a "risk" grade for deep-water soloing routes (they typically use the French grading system or American YDS system for the technical challenge). Notable examples include the British S-grades (e.g. S0, S1, S2, S3), which covers the objective risk of the route including tides, under-water objects, height of any potential fall etc.

== Bouldering ==
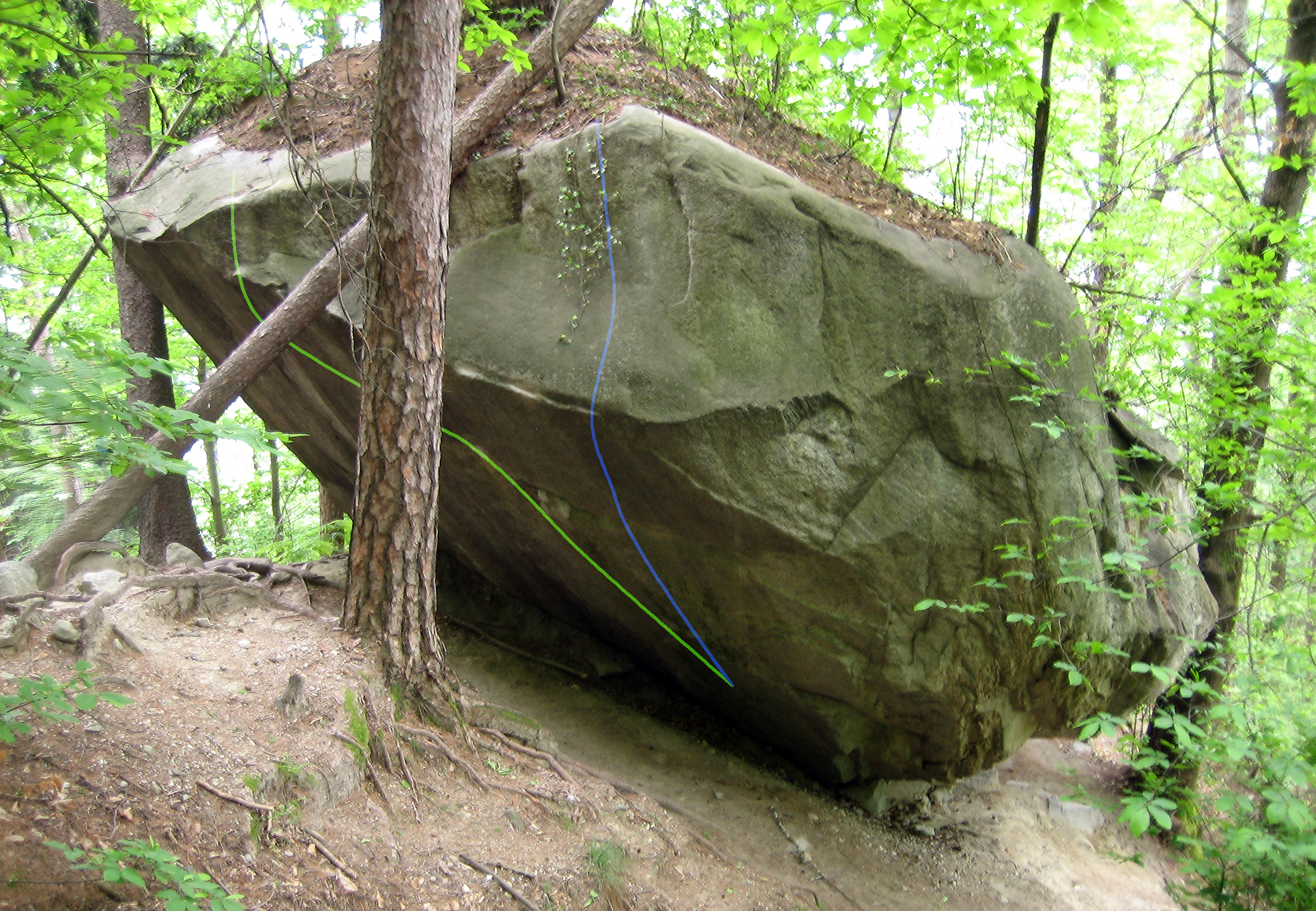
Dreamtime V15 (8C) follows the diagonal green line, and Somnolence V13 (8B) follows the vertical blue line.

The two main boulder grading systems are the French Font-grade and the American V-grade systems. Beyond the easiest grades, the two systems can be almost exactly aligned in comparison tables. For people who have little experience with outdoor climbing, it is also noted that boulder grades on indoor climbing walls tend to feel softer than the equivalent outdoor grades up until about V7 / Font 7C+ (since people climbing at that level generally have plenty of outdoor experience).

As of May 2026, the hardest bouldering grade is V17 / Font 9A and Burden of Dreams, in Lappnor in Finland, was the first-ever boulder to be given that grade.

=== Comparison with free climbing ===
The Font-grade system is easily confused with the French sport grade and the British E-grade systems as they use similar symbols, but boulder grades are very different from free climbing grades and they start at much harder technical levels. For example, the entry-level Font-grade 4 / V-grade V0 is equivalent to the free climbing grades of 6a to 6a+ (French), VI to VII− (UIAA), and 5.9 to 5.10c (American YDS), depending on what table is used.

This confusion is amplified by the tendency for modern sport-climbers to describe the crux moves on their routes in terms of their bouldering grades – their routes are effectively a series of connected boulder problems. For example, here is Adam Ondra describing his 2017 redpoint of Silence, the first-ever free climb in the world to carry a grade of 9c (French), 5.15d (American), XII+ (UIAA):

The climb is about 45m long, the first 20m are about 8b [French sport] climbing with a couple of really really good knee-bars. Then comes the crux boulder problem, 10 moves of 8C [French boulder]. And when I say 8C boulder problem, I really mean it. ... I reckon just linking 8C [French boulder] into 8B [French boulder] into 7C [French boulder] is a 9b+ [French] sport climb, I'm pretty sure about that.

— Adam Ondra in an interview with PlanetMountain (2017).

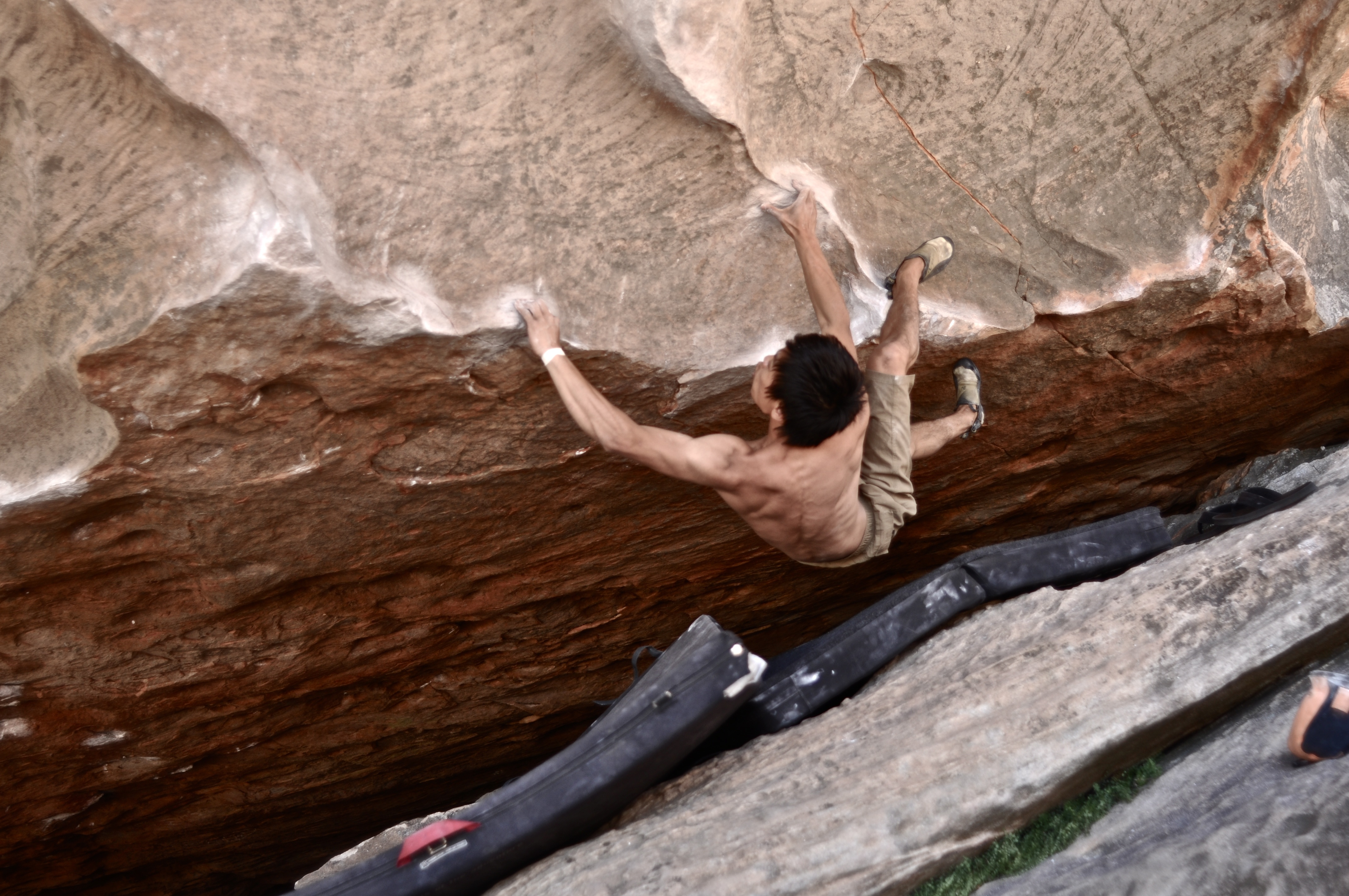
Climber on Rave Heart V8 (7B/7B+) section of The Wheel of Life, which is graded as a boulder route at V15 (8C), and a free climbing route at f9a (5.14d)

In addition, boulder routes that connected various boulder problems into a single longer bouldering route have been graded as if they were sport climbs. A notable example is the 2004 boulder route The Wheel of Life, which is graded V15 (8C) as a boulder route, but also f9a (5.14d) as a sport climbing route.

=== Font grade ===
The Font-grade (from the "Fontainebleau climbing area") is one of the oldest boulder grading systems whose origins can be traced back to at least 1960 with Michel Libert's L'Abbatoir at Fontainebleau. The Font-scale is open-ended that starts at 1 and increases in single-digit steps but uses a "+" for additional refinement between steps; from grade 6 it introduces a capitalized "A", "B" and "C" for further refinement, and was at 9A in 2026 with Burden of Dreams. The Font-scale has no regard to risk and is focused on the technical difficulty of the movements. The Font-scale is distinguished from the French sport grade by using capitalized letters (e.g., Font 6C+ vs. f6c+), and also the use of "fb" or capital "F" (for "Font") as a prefix. The distinction is important as the scales are very different (e.g., Fb6C+ is closer to f7c).

=== V-grade ===
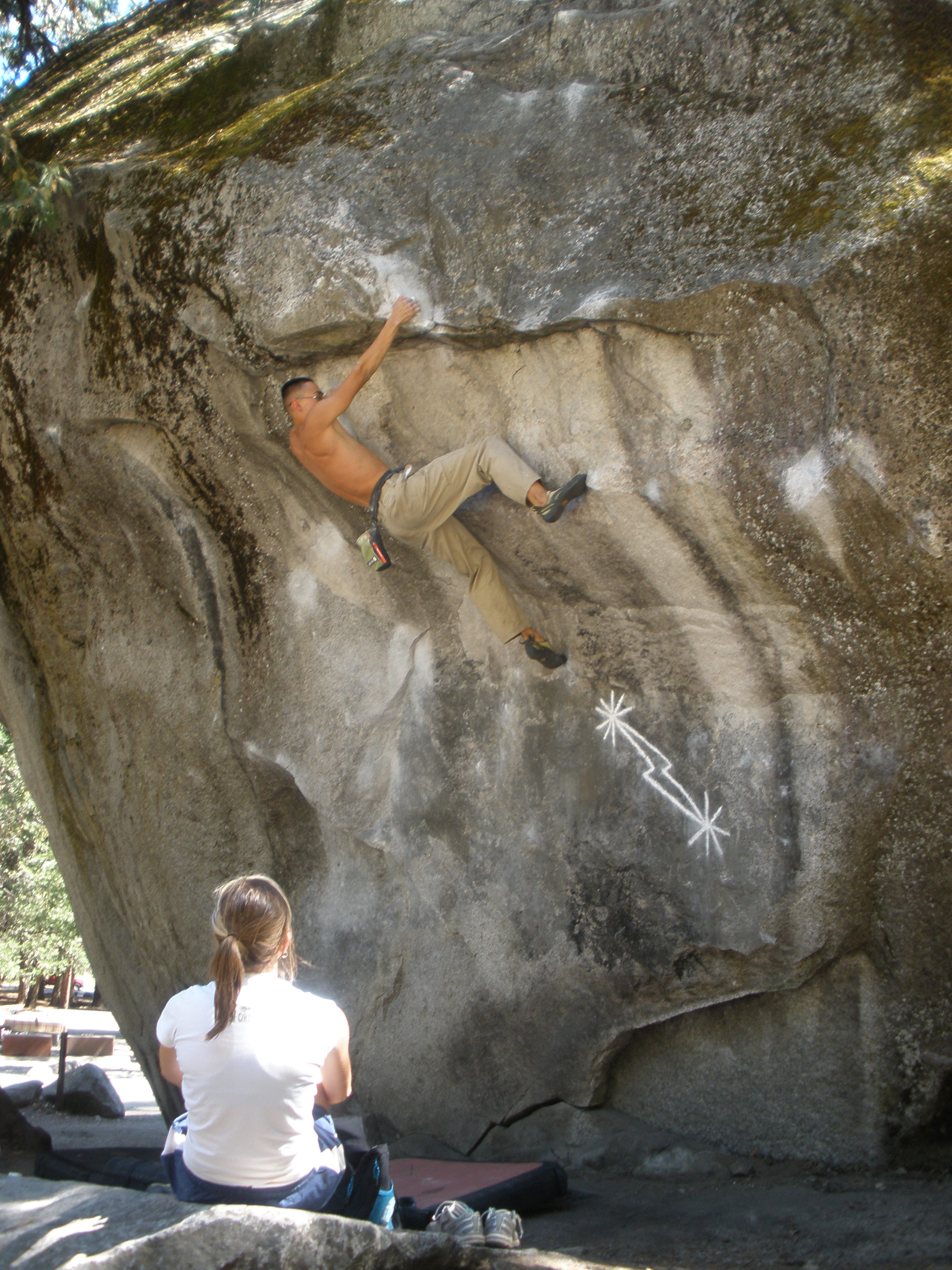
Midnight Lightning is one of the most famous boulder routes in history and the second-ever V8 (7B/7B+).

The V-grade (short for "Vermin" or "Verm", and also known as the "Hueco" scale) was first published in 1991 by American bouldering pioneer John "Verm" Sherman in his climbing guidebook, Hueco Tanks Climbing and Bouldering Guide. Legend is that his publisher would not print the book without some kind of rating of his 900 routes. The V-scale is an open-ended scale that starts at V0 (although a slightly easier "VB" has been used for beginners), and increases in single-digit steps (i.e. V5, V6, V7), and was at V17 in 2026 with Burden of Dreams. The V-scale doesn't consider risk and is purely focused on the technical difficulty of the movements. The V-scale is the dominant scale in North America, and it and the Font scale are the most dominant systems worldwide; beyond the easiest grades, the two systems almost exactly align in comparison tables.

=== Other notable systems ===
- Japanese Dankyū system. Also known as the "kyū dan" system, is widely used in Japan, and is constructed in a way that resembles martial arts grading systems (see Dan and Kyu). Developed in the Japanese bouldering area of Ogawayama, the system begins at 10-kyū (easiest) and gets progressively harder as it counts down to 1-kyū. As with martial arts grading, after 1-kyū the system uses "black-belt grades" of 1-Dan (or shodan, "the first step"); 1-Dan is roughly equal to a V7 grade, while 6-Dan (or rokudan) is at V16.
- American "B" system. Created by American bouldering pioneer John Gill in 1958, it contained just three grades: B1 (easiest), B2, and B3 (hardest). B1 was "'difficult', denoting the highest level in roped climbing (about 5.10 trad [or French 6a / UIAA VI+] at the time)", B2 was "'very difficult'—or greater than 5.10—a category for stouter, 'bouldering-level' problems", and B3 was "the 'limit', a problem done only once (or, as Gill wrote in his 1969 essay The Art of Bouldering, is "very rarely repeated, although frequently tried without success"). Repeats, even by the first-ascent party, automatically dropped the grade [from B3]".
- British Peak B-grade. The Peak District in Britain is an important bouldering area and had developed a bouldering scale that was very similar to the V-grade scale except the pre-fix "B" was used and it started at B1 (i.e. B1, B2, B3, B4, ... etc.). Peak B-grades are roughly one level easier than V-grades (e.g. V8 was equivalent to B9). The V-grade / Font-grade systems (sometimes the "technical grade" component of the British E-grade system is used) have replaced Peak B-grades in Britain but they appear in some guidebooks and some boulder grade conversion tables.

== Aid climbing ==
The main aid climbing systems are the A-grade (the "new wave" version) and C-grade systems. While aid climbing is less popular as a standalone pursuit, aid techniques remain important in big wall and alpine climbing, where the level of difficulties can vary significantly on long routes, and thus the use of aid in places is still common (e.g. The Nose on El Capitan is graded '5.9 (American) C2 (aid)' with aid, but an extremely difficult '5.14a (American)' without any aid; guidebooks will mark such routes as '5.9 & C2 (5.14a)', with the no-aid/fully free option in brackets.

=== Instability of aid grades ===
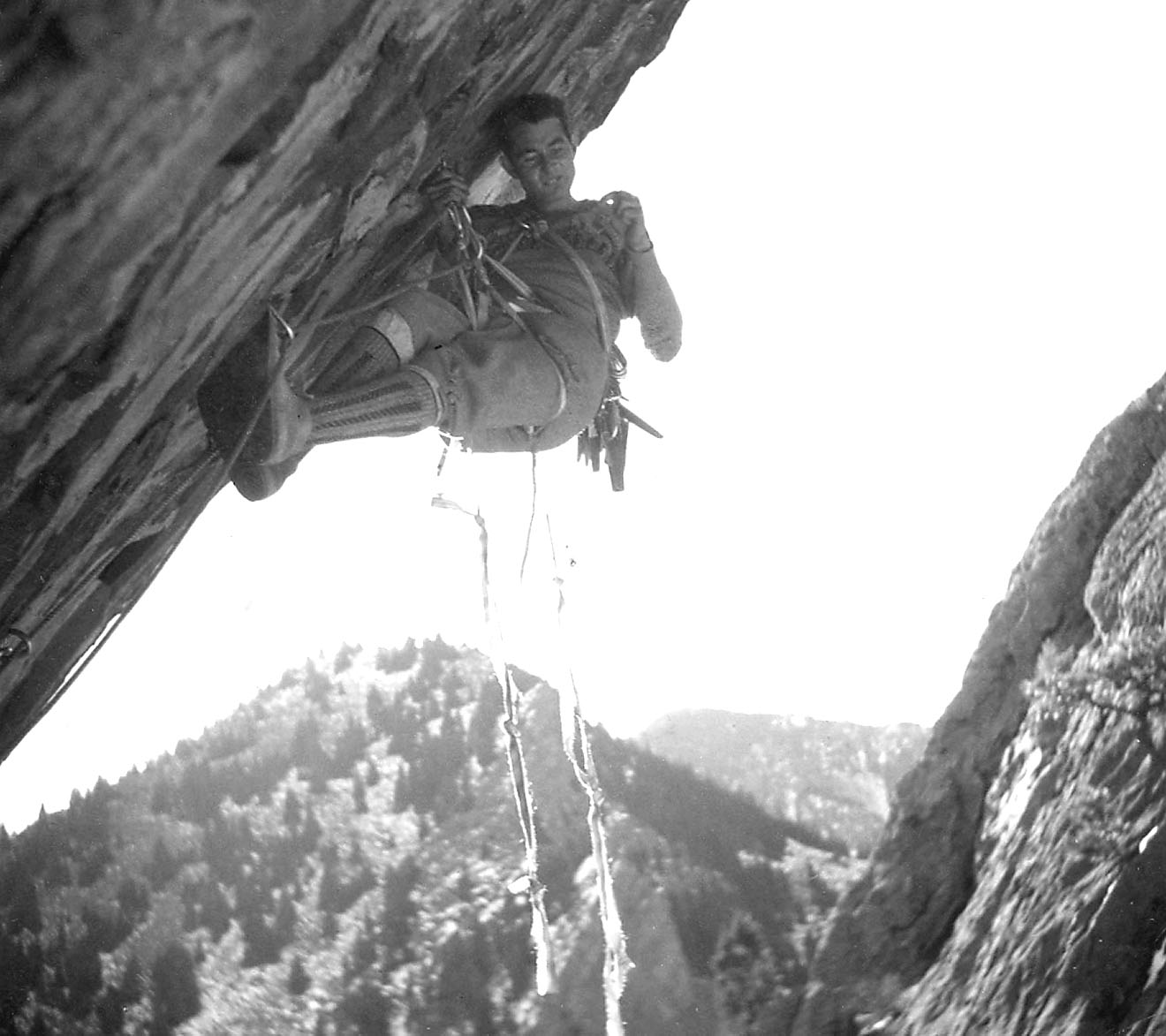
Layton Kor on the first ascent of Exhibit A Eldorado Canyon; the route was then graded 5.9 A4 (original A-grade), but is now graded 5.8 C2+ R (post "new-wave" C-grade).

The grade of an aid climbing route can change materially over time due to improvements in aid equipment but also due to the impact of repeated ascents. It is not uncommon for a new A5 route in Yosemite to become a "beaten-out A3+ route" due to the effect of repeated hammering of cracks (which widens them), and to the build-up of permanent in-situ aid climbing equipment, from successive teams.

=== Original A-grade ===
The original "UIAA Scale of Difficulty in Aided Climbing" system went from A1 to A5 and focused on the number and quality of "bodyweight placements" (i.e. can only take static bodyweight and not a falling bodyweight) versus "bombproof placements" on a given pitch. The grades were less concerned with the physical demands of the route, and risk was only introduced later with A5.

=== New wave A-grade ===
In the 1990s, Yosemite aid climbers created what they called a "new wave" aid grading system that expanded the range of the original UIAA system to A6 (they had already re-defined parts of the UIAA system), and introduced an intermediate "+" grade from A2 onwards for specific tricky or strenuous sections, and gave more detailed definitions at each grading level than the original A-grades.

=== Clean C-grade ===
When established aid climbs can be ascended without the use of a hammer (for pitons or copperheads), the "A" suffix is replaced by a "C" to denote "clean climbing". In Yosemite, an "F" suffix is placed after the "C" if fixed gear (e.g. bolts) is required to go clean (or hammerless).

== Ice and mixed climbing ==
The most dominant international system for ice climbing is the WI-grade, while the most dominant system for mixed climbing is the M-grade (with the Scottish Winter grade also notable given the unique nature of Scottish mixed routes). Where a route has no ice, and not even the "thin ice coating" common on Scottish Winter routes, it is increasingly common to use a D-grade to indicate dry-tooling. Some M-graded routes in "dry" areas (e.g., places like the American Rockies, but not Scotland), are more of a combination of a WI-graded ice route with a D-graded dry-tooling route.

=== WI-grade ===
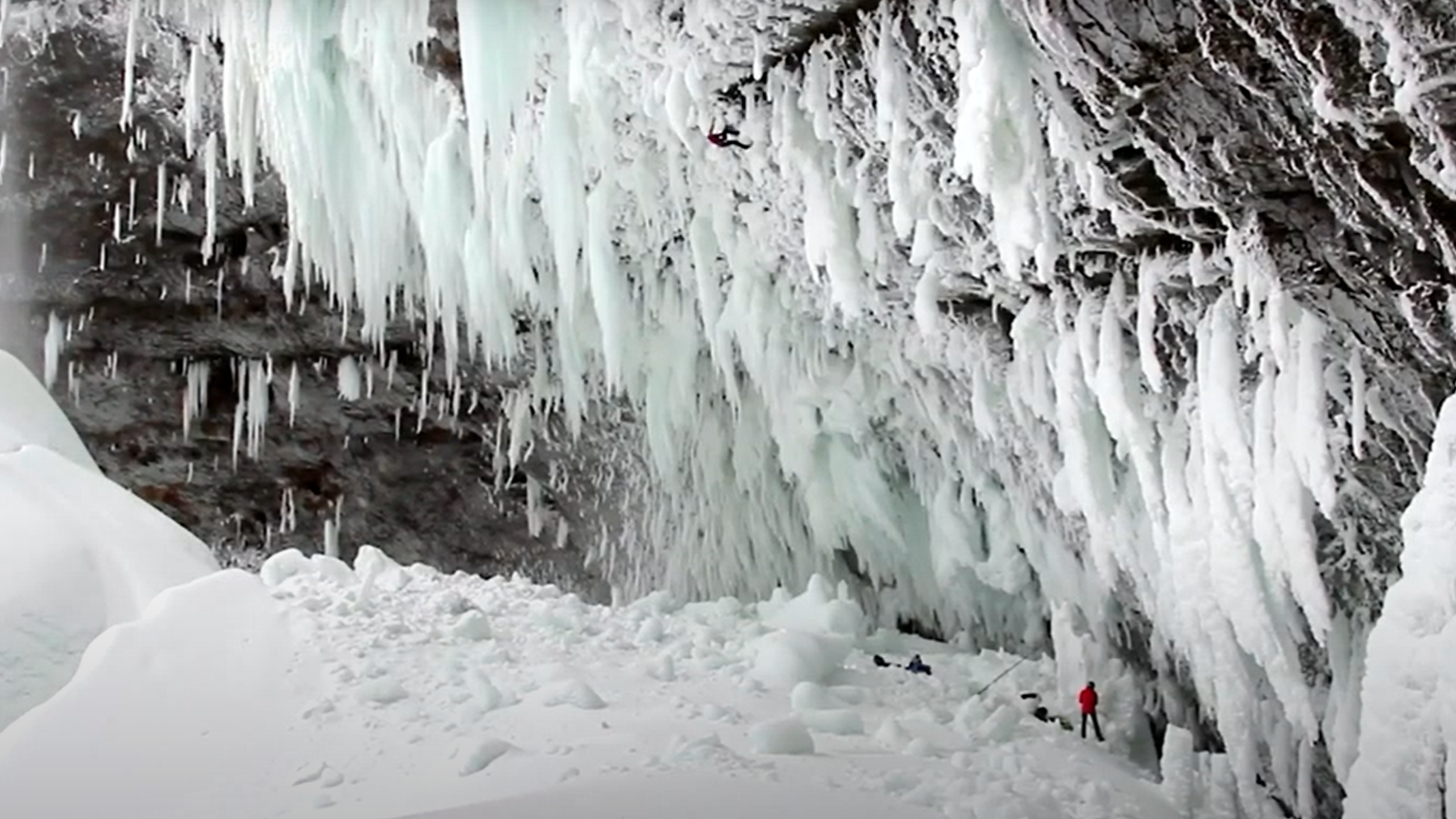
Angelika Rainer high up on the severely overhanging Clash of Titans (graded WI10+), Helmcken Falls

The most dominant ice climbing system is the WI (for "water ice") grading system. WI-grades broadly equate to the mixed climbing M-grades from WI1 up to WI6/WI7, but after M6/M7, mixed climbs become overhanging, which ice does not. WI-grades take some account of the difficulty of placing protection on the route but, as with M-grades, are more focused on the technical and physical challenge of the route, and are more akin to the French and American YDS free climbing systems, although as with the American YDS system, an "R/X" suffix is sometimes used alongside the WI-grade to grade additional risks.

WI-grade is for "hard ice". The steep snow slopes that are encountered frequently on alpine climbing routes are not explicitly WI-graded, and instead, their steepest angle (approximate figure or a range) is quoted (e.g. 60–70 degree slope). WI-grade is also for "seasonal" hard ice. An AI prefix is used for "alpine ice", which is year-round and firmer, more stable, making AI-grade routes slightly easier.

In 2010, ice climbers began to put up new ice routes at Helmcken Falls in Canada that had unique characteristics. Unlike the sheerest WI7 ice routes, these routes were significantly overhanging like extreme M-graded routes. This was due to the intense spray from the waterfall, which covered the overhanging routes in ice so that there was little dry-tooling (i.e. all the movement was on hard ice). The routes were bolted like M-grade climbs and the result was a series of new WI-graded routes that laid claim as the "world's hardest ice routes"; by 2020, they reached WI13 with Mission to Mars.

=== M-grade ===
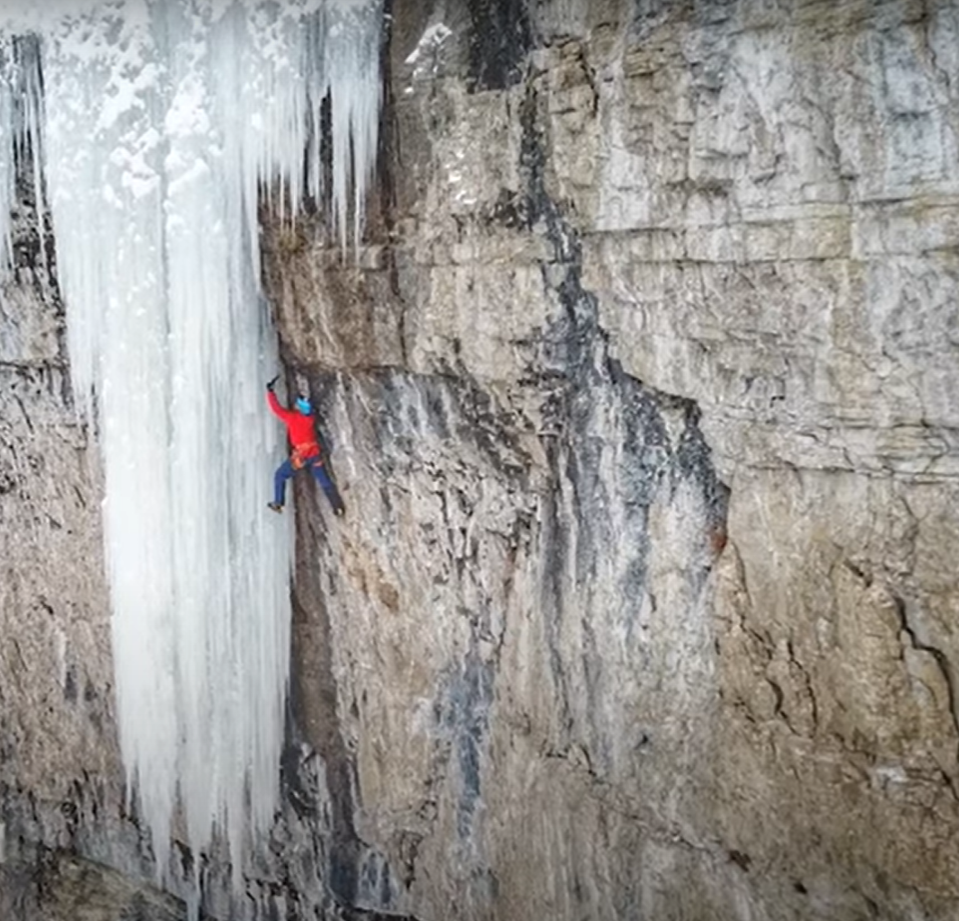
Rocket Man (M9), Wyoming. Many M-grade routes are really a combination of a WI-grade ice route and a D-grade dry tooling route.

The grading of mixed climbing routes approximates ice climbing WI grades up to M6, but then diverge as mixed routes can become very overhanging and eventually turn into roofs (ice does not overhang, aside from Helmcken Falls routes). M-grades do not take into account the "danger" of the route (i.e. how good is the protection in the event of a fall) as they are mostly pre-bolted routes; they, therefore, focus on the technical and physical challenge of the route, and are thus more akin to the French and American free climbing rock grades, although as with the American system, the "R/X" suffix is used for danger.

In his 1996 book, Ice World, mixed climbing pioneer Jeff Lowe ranked his new M-grades to the level of physical exertion needed on a free rock climb; for example, Lowe estimated that M8 was equivalent to 5.12 (American YDS). Other authors have tried to align M-grades with rock climbing grades, and now equate M8 to 5.10/5.11, but there is some variation and no consensus that such comparisons are valid.

=== D-grade ===
When mixed climbing is done as pure dry-tooling, which is ice climbing on bare rock with no ice section, the M-grade is usually replaced by a "D" grade prefix (but all other aspects of the two systems are identical). As of October 2026, the most extreme dry-tooling route is Téleios (D16+), which is in the Tana del Drago cave in Ponte nelle Alpi, Italy, and was first ascended by Matteo Pilon in 2024 and repeated by Giovanni Bona in 2025.

=== Scottish winter grade ===
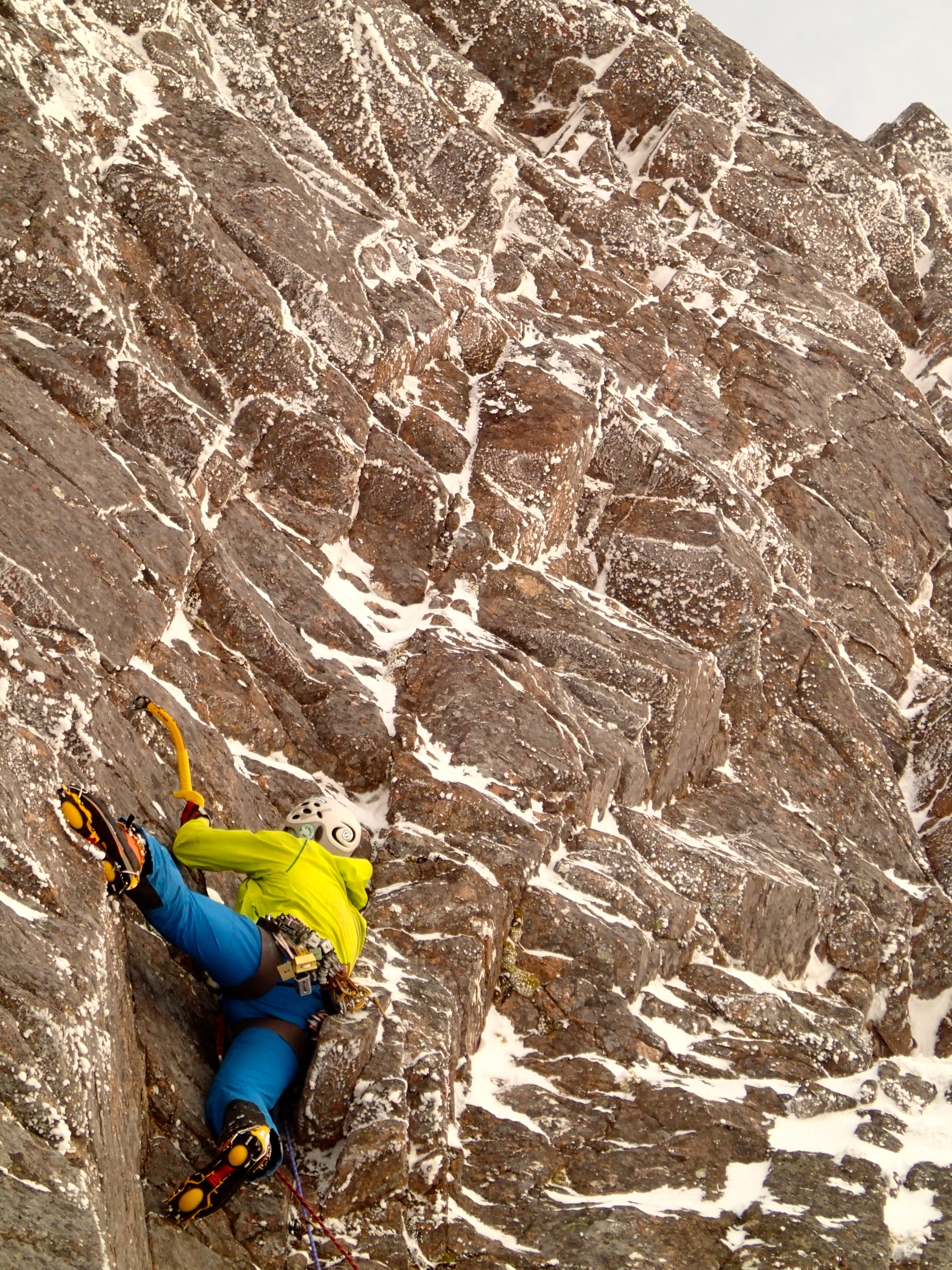
Greg Boswell on the first ascent of Banana Wall, the second-ever Scottish Winter Grade XII/12 route

Mixed climbing in Scotland is known as "Scottish Winter climbing" and uses a dual-grading system – similar to the British E-grade – with a Roman numeral denoting the "overall" difficulty (e.g. technical challenge, length, and the level of boldness/physicality/stamina required). A second Arabic number grades the technical difficulty of the hardest move on the route. A climb graded (VI, 6) means the difficulty of the hardest move is standard for the overall grade, whereas a climb graded (VI, 8) denotes the hardest move is above the overall grade.

This dual grade is needed as Scottish winter climbs use traditional climbing protection, placing greater strains on the climber. British climber Ian Parnell wrote in his guide to Scottish winter climbing that Scottish grades are almost two levels above M-grades, and thus a Scottish (VIII, 8) is similar to an M6; but that an onsight of a Scottish VIII, 8 using traditional climbing protection, would be similar in difficulty to a bolted sport climbing M8.

=== Other notable systems ===
- Canadian Ice. Canadian ice climbs quote the Canadian Winter Commitment Grade with Roman numerals 1–7 for the "overall" challenges and risks, and a "technical scale" with Arabic levels 1–7 for the hardest movements. Other grades can be provided to reflect mixed climbing (M-level), the thickness of the ice (R-level), and the fragility of the structure (X-level). In practice, Canadian Ice "technical grades" are equivalent to WI-grades, but omit the "WI"; a typical route could be graded as III-4.
- New England Ice (NEI). A system was developed in the 1970s in New England that used NEI levels 1 to 5 (and a later level of 5+) to grade ice routes, which in effect equated to the WI-grades of WI1 to WI5 (and NEI 5+ at WI6). The NEI levels are considered to be slightly "harder" than the equivalent WI-grades. Following the international trend, the WI-system is now commonly used in New England.

== Mountaineering ==
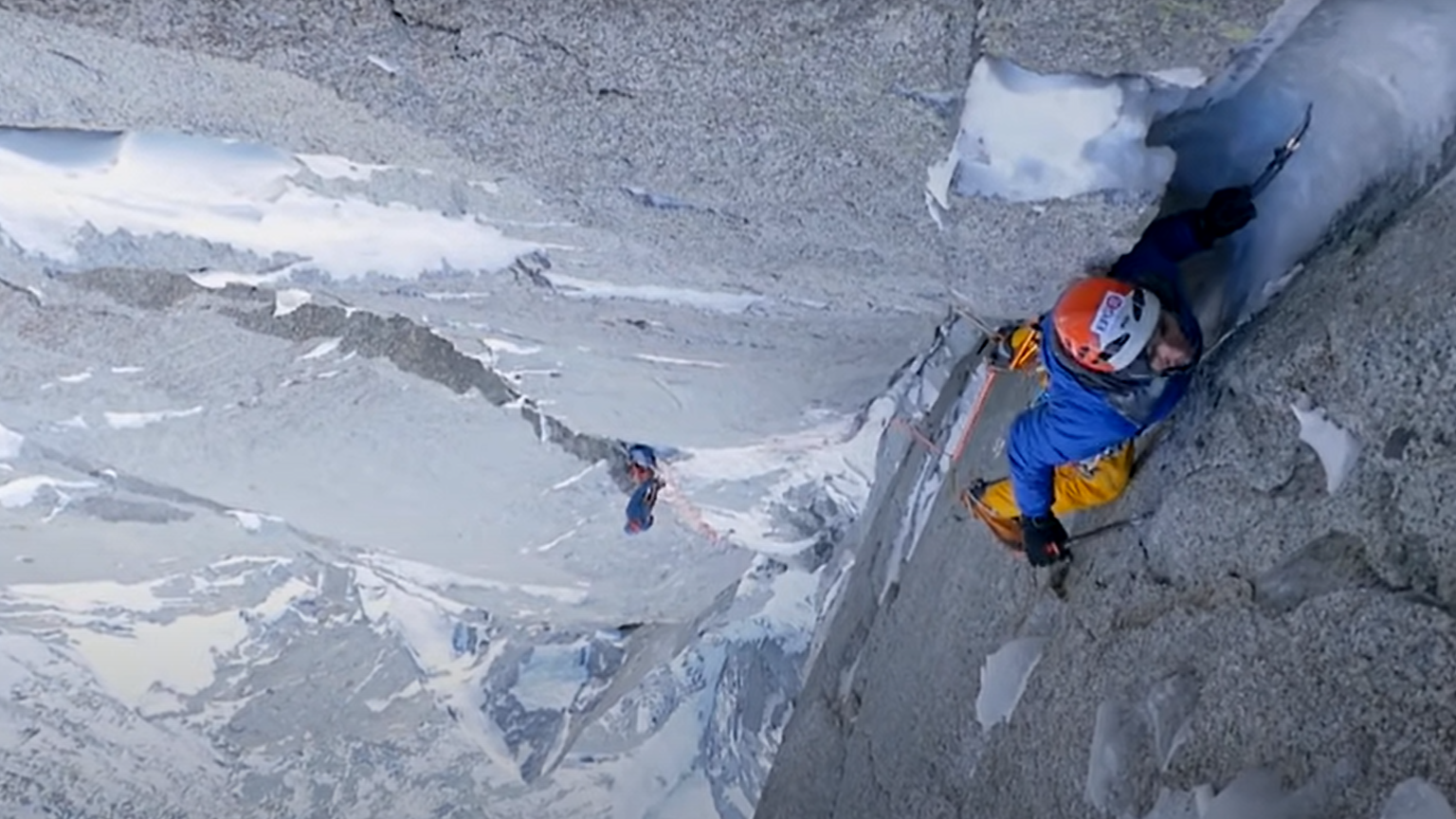
Alpinist Ueli Steck on the 800-metre alpine climbing route, the North Couloir Direct on Les Drus in France, which is graded ED (IFAS-overall), VI (UIAA-rock), AI6 (WI-ice), M8 (M-mixed)

The dominant grading system in mountaineering is the International French Adjectival System (IFAS) (or French Alpine System, FAS), which is effectively the "UIAA Scale of Overall Difficulty" (they only differ in labels), and which is used in all forms of alpine climbing around the world.

Due to the complexity and length of mountaineering and alpine climbing routes, their grading systems focus on the "overall" risk and/or commitment of the route. The specific rock climbing, aid climbing, and/or ice and mixed climbing difficulties of the route will be graded separately (per the earlier grading systems), and listed alongside the mountaineering grade.

For a time, there were a number of "commitment grade" systems that focused on the time required for a route (e.g. Grade I being several hours to Grade VII being several weeks), such as the American National Climbing Classification System (NCCS), but for various reasons these are now in less use.

=== International French Adjectival System ===
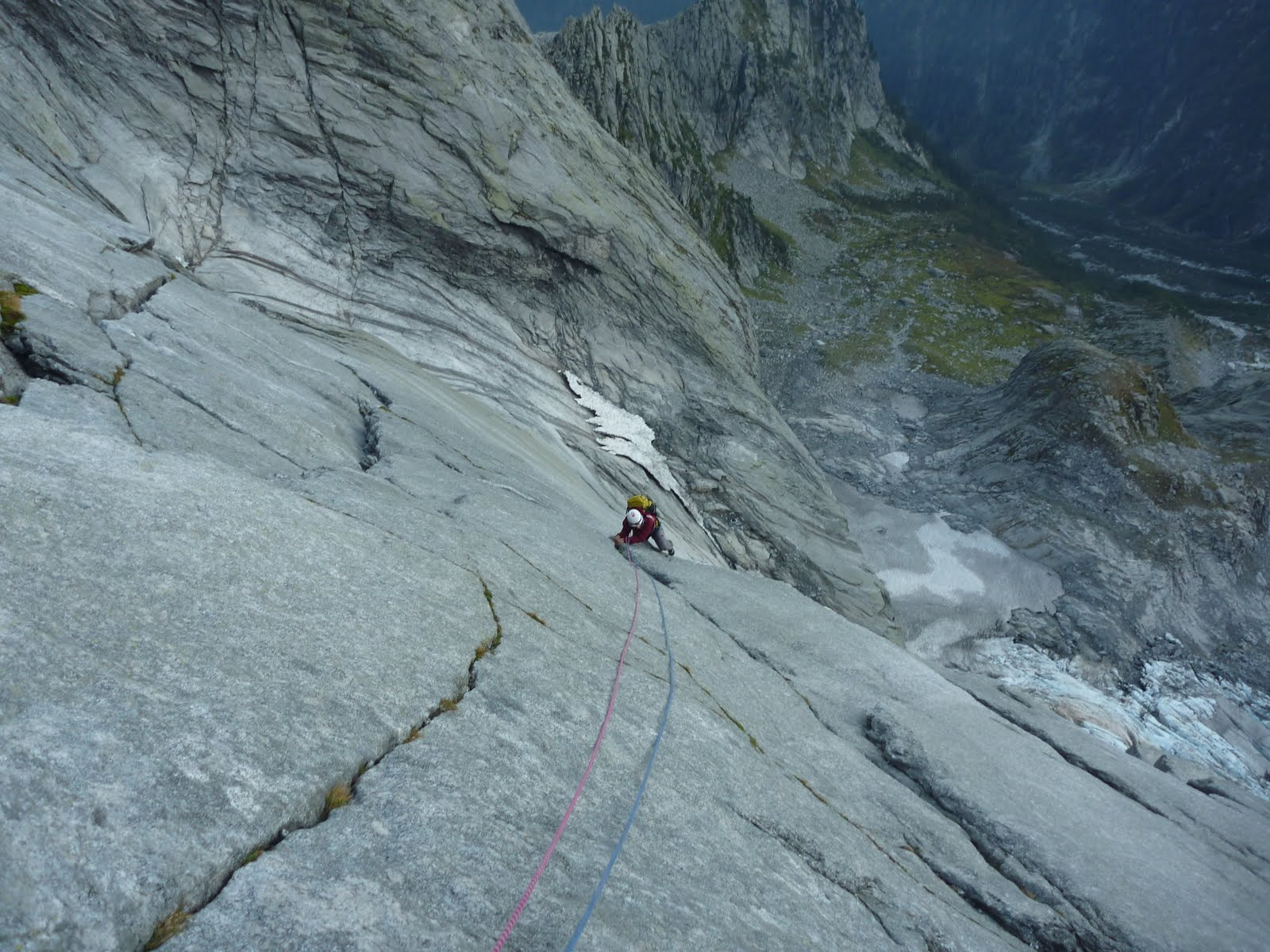
Alpine climber on the famous big wall Cassin Route on Piz Badile, which is 850-metres, 25-pitches, and graded TD (IFAS), 5.9 (American), 5c (French), VI− (UIAA-rock), IV (NCCS)

The IFAS system (or UIAA Scale of Overall Difficulty), also called the French Alpine System (or Alpine System), grades the overall difficulty of a route, taking into account the length, technical difficulties, exposure, and commitment level (i.e. how hard is a retreat). The system was created by French climbers, and when the UIAA formally adopted it in 1967 they assigned Roman numerals to the six levels, which caused confusion with the UIAA scale, and thus the French shorthand for the six levels prevailed: F–Facile (easy), PD–Peu Difficile (not very difficult), AD–Assez Difficile (fairly difficult), D–Difficile (difficult), TD–Très Difficile (very difficult), and ED-Extrêmement difficile (extremely difficult).

Later, a + (pronounced Sup for supérieur) or a − (pronounced Inf for inférieur) was used to indicate if a particular climb is at the lower or upper end of that grade (e.g., a climb slightly harder than "PD+" might be "AD−"), and the specific degree of the snow slopes was added (e.g. 60 degrees).

As standards rose, the ED-grade was further expanded into ED1 (is the original ED−), ED2 (is roughly the original ED), ED3 (is the original ED+), ED4, ED5 .. etc., to denote harder levels of grade.

Whilst each IFAS grade can imply certain grades of rock, ice, or mixed climbing difficulties, the UIAA warns against assuming an IFAS grade always aligns with specific rock and ice climbing grades. This is because the overall objective dangers can vary dramatically on alpine routes with similar technical rock and ice climbing grades. For example, the famous 1,800-metre 1938 Heckmair Route on the north face of the Eiger has an IFAS ED2-grade even though the technical rock climbing challenge is only at UIAA VI− and the technical ice climbing challenge is at 60 degrees (which is a WI-4 grade), which are more typically associated with an IFAS D-grade; this is due to the exceptional length and serious dangers of the route. Some guidebooks have attempted to list implied technical rock and ice climbing grades that are normally associated with each IFAS grade.

=== American NCCS ===
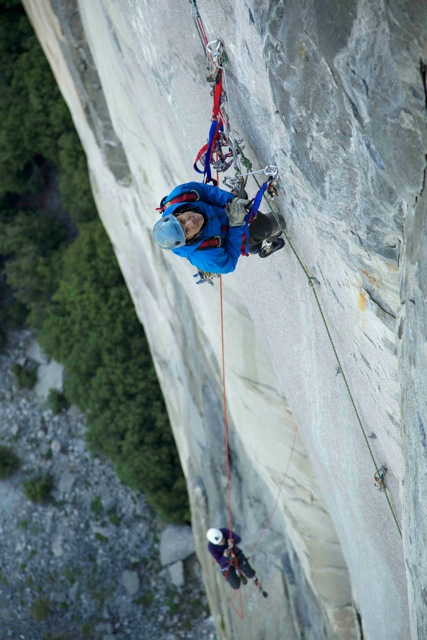
The 16-pitch El Capitan big wall route, Zodiac, is graded 5.7 (American), A2+ (A-grade), VI (NCCS) with aid; or 5.13d (American), VI (NCCS) free.

The National Climbing Classification System (NCCS) was proposed in the early1960s by Leigh Ortenburger and other leading climbers, which included a "commitment grade" for mountaineering routes with the likely timescales for an "average" team. The NCCS commitment grade uses Roman numerals from Grade I (few hours of climbing) to Grade VII (several weeks of climbing). The NCCS was popular for a period on American big wall climbing routes, but advancements in techniques, and the ability for climbers to complete big wall routes in hours that historically took days (or weeks), made the NCCS less useful; it is still quoted on American big wall routes (although it is confused as being the UIAA scale). NCCS grades are described as:

- NCCS Grade I and Grade II: "Half a day or less for the technical (5th [i.e. the Yosemite Decimal System grade] class) portion of the route". These levels are often also listed as "1–3 hours" (for grade I), and "3–5 hours" (for grade II).
- NCCS Grade III: "Most of a day of roped climbing". Often listed as "5–8 hours".
- NCCS Grade IV: "A full day of technical climbing". Often listed as "a full day".
- NCCS Grade V: "Typically requires an overnight on the route, or done fast and free in a day". Grade V is often listed as "one very long day of climbing, or two full days of climbing".
- NCCS Grade VI: "Two or more days of hard climbing". Often listed as "two days to a week".
- NCCS Grade VII: "Remote walls climbed in alpine style". Often listed as "more than a week of hard climbing in extreme (i.e. alpine) conditions".

=== Russian ===
The Russian grading system has a range from grade 1A–6B that aligns in comparison tables with the IFAS/UIAA system (the six levels align with the original six UIAA Scale of Global Difficulty levels), and factors in difficulty, altitude, length, and commitment (i.e. risk and difficulty of retreat); the grades are described as:

- Russian Grade 1B: Some easy roped climbing.
- Russian Grade 2A: Several pitches of easy roped climbing.
- Russian Grade 2B: Some (UIAA scale) II+ and III climbing on a multi-pitch route.
- Russian Grade 3A: Contains 1 to 1.5 pitches of III climbing on a multi-pitch route.
- Russian Grade 3B: One or two pitches of III+/IV climbing on a full-day route.
- Russian Grade 4A: A full-day route with IV+ climbing.
- Russian Grade 4B: Several pitches of IV+ or some V+ climbing.
- Russian Grade 5A: Contains several pitches of V climbing on a 1- to 3-day route.
- Russian Grade 5B: Two-plus days with some VI+ climbing.
- Russian Grade 6A and 6B: Multi-day routes with considerable VI or harder climbing.

=== Alaskan ===
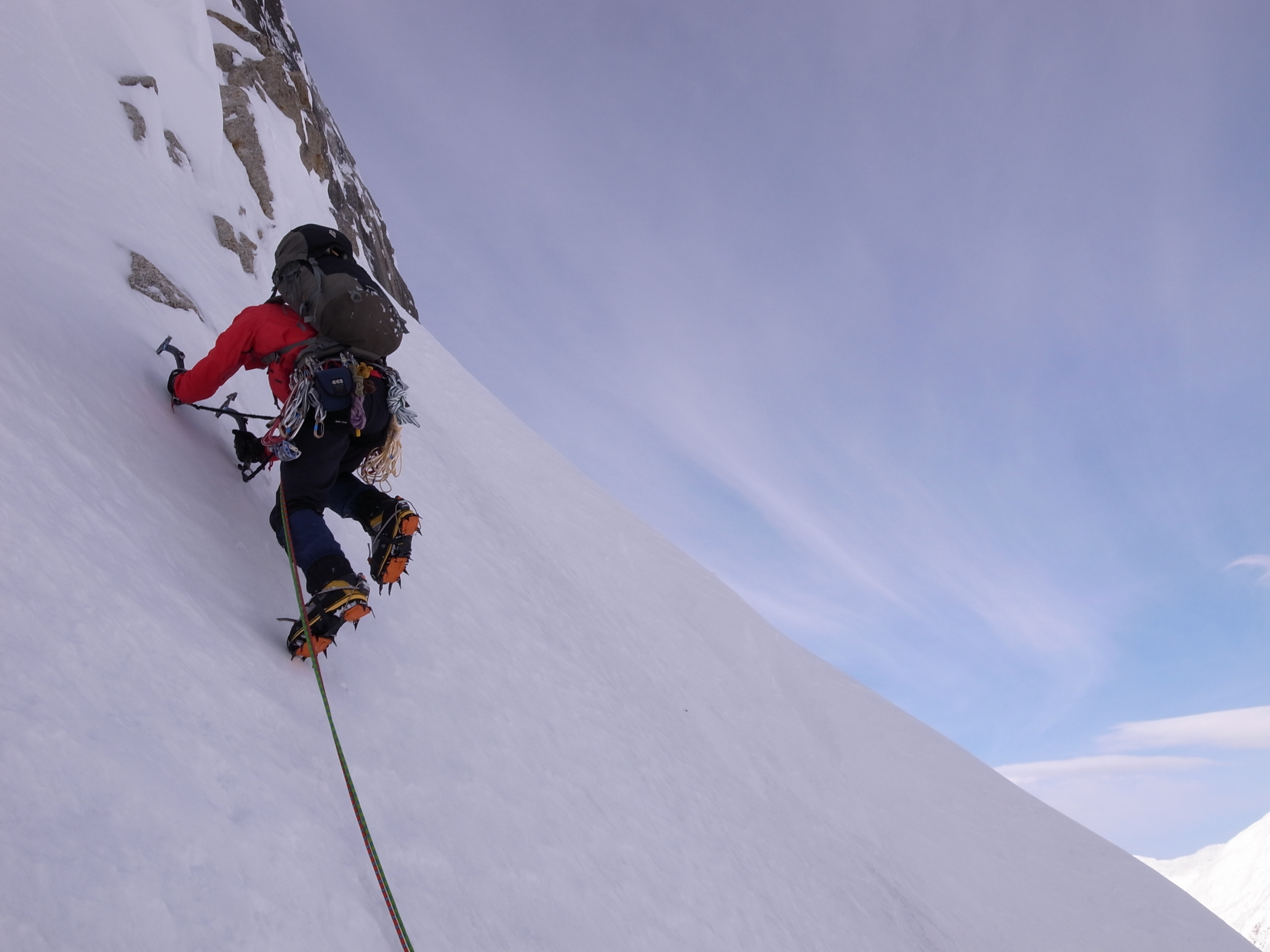
The iconic Moonflower Buttress alpine climbing route on Mount Hunter Alaska, which is graded 5.8 (American YDS), WI-6 (ice), M7 (mixed), A2 (Alaska)

In the "Alaskan Overall Difficulties" system, mountaineering routes are graded from 1 (easiest) to 6 (hardest), and factor in difficulty, length, and commitment (including storms, cold, and cornicing). The system was developed by Boyd N. Everett Jr. in 1966, for the challenges of Alaskan climbing, and rarely appears outside of the region. A summary from Alaska: A Climbing Guide (2001):

- Alaska Grade 1: Climb requires one day only, no technical (fifth-class) climbing.
- Alaska Grade 2: Either a moderate fifth-class one-day climb, or a normal multiday nontechnical climb.
- Alaska Grade 3: Either a serious fifth-class one-day climb, or a multiday climb with technical elements.
- Alaska Grade 4: Multiday, moderately technical climb.
- Alaska Grade 5: Multiday, highly technical climb.
- Alaska Grade 6: Multiday, extremely technical climb.

A plus (+) may be added to indicate somewhat higher difficulty. For example, the West Buttress Route on Denali is graded 2+ in the aforementioned guidebook. Importantly, even an Alaska Grade 1 climb may involve climbing on snow and glaciers in remote locations and cold weather.

=== Other notable systems ===
- Canadian Winter Commitment Grade. This system has seven levels denoted by Roman numerals I–VII, and is similar to the NCCS grading system, being focused on the time commitment needed to complete the route with some regard to the increasing technical difficulty and the number of pitches and challenges that may be encountered; as with the NCCS system, it is less used today.
- New Zealand Mount Cook system. This system was proposed by Hugh Logan in his 1982 guidebook The Mount Cook Guidebook with NZ levels 1–7 (and a "+" prefix for refinement between levels) that roughly matched the six IFAS/UIAA levels, and with NZ level 7 at IFAS ED2/3. Logan's system was used for several decades until a new version was proposed by Robert Frost in his 2018 guidebook Aoraki Tai Poutini that had two sets of grades: Level I–VII for seriousness and commitment, and Level 1–8 for the technical challenge (rock, ice and mixed climbing).

== Comparison tables ==
=== Free climbing comparison ===
Free climbing systems can be broadly compared per the table below. While most systems do not perfectly align, especially at the lower (or easier) grades, above the level of circa 5.12a (American YDS), f7a+ (French), VIII+, the sport climbing becomes the dominant free-climbing format and most grades closely align; the exception being the traditional climbing focused British E-grade system.

American YDS	British E-grade		French sport	UIAA scale	Saxon scale	Ewbank (Aus. & NZ)	Ewbank (South Africa)	Scandinavian		Brazilian technical	Polish Kurtyka
American YDS	Tech	Adj	French sport	UIAA scale	Saxon scale	Ewbank (Aus. & NZ)	Ewbank (South Africa)	Finland	Norway	Brazilian technical	Polish Kurtyka
3–4	1	M	1	I	I	1–2	1–2	1	1	I	I
5.0						3–4	3–4			I sup	
5.1	2		2	II	II	5–6	5–6	2	2	II	II
5.2		D				7	7			II sup	
5.3	3		3	III	III	8–9	8–9	3	3		III
5.4		VD	4a	IV	IV	10	10			III	IV
5.5	4a	S	4b	IV+/V−	V	11–12	11–12	4	4	III sup	
5.6	4b	HS	4c	V	VI	13	13			IV	IV+
5.7	4c	VS	5a	V+		14–15	14–15	5−	5−		V−
5.8		HVS	5b	VI−	VIIa	16	16	5	5	IV sup	V
5.9	5a		5c	VI	VIIb	17	17–18	5+	5+	V	V+
5.10a		E1	6a	VI+	VIIc	18	19		6−		VI
5.10b	5b		6a+	VII−		19	20	6−		Vsup	VI+
5.10c		E2	6b	VII	VIIIa	20	21	6	6	VI	VI.1
5.10d	5c		6b+	VII+	VIIIb		22		6+	VI sup	VI.1+
5.11a		E3	6c 6c+		VIIIc	21		6+	7− 7	7a	VI.2 VI.2+
5.11b			6c 6c+	VIII−		22	23	7− 7	7− 7	7b	VI.2 VI.2+
5.11c	6a	E4	6c 6c+		IXa	23	24	7− 7	7− 7	7c	VI.2 VI.2+
5.11d			7a	VIII	IXb		25	7− 7	7+		VI.3
5.12a		E5	7a+	VIII+	IXc	24	26	7+	7+/8−	8a	VI.3+
5.12b	6b		7b			25	27	8−	8−	8b	VI.4
5.12c		E6	7b+	IX−	Xa	26	28	8	8	8c	
5.12d			7c	IX	Xb	27	29	8+	8/8+	9a	VI.4+
5.13a	6c		7c+	IX+	Xc	28	30	9−	8+	9b	VI.5
5.13b		E7	8a	X−	XIa	29	31	9	9−	9c	VI.5+
5.13c	7a		8a+	X−	XIa	30	32	9+	9−/9	10a	
5.13d		E8	8b	X	XIb	31	33	10−	9	10b	VI.6
5.14a			8b+	X+	XIc	32	34	10	9/9+	10c	VI.6+
5.14b	7b	E9	8c	XI−	XIIa	33	35	10+	9+	11a	VI.7
5.14c			8c+	XI	XIIb	34	36	11−	10−	11b	VI.7+
5.14d		E10	9a	XI+	XIIc	35	37	11	10	11c	VI.8
5.15a		E11	9a+	XII−	XIIIa	36	38	11+	10/10+	12a	VI.8+
5.15b			9b	XII−	XIIIa	37	39	12−	10+	12b	
5.15c			9b+	XII	XIIIb	38	40	12	11−	12c	VI.9
5.15d			9c	XII+	XIIIc	39	41	12+	11	13a	VI.9+

Main sources: RockFax Rock Climbing Grade Table (2021), theCrag (2023),

=== Bouldering comparison ===
The American and French boulder grade systems can be compared, and exactly align after V9 / 7C. Various authors have created tables to compare bouldering grades of Font/V-grade, to the free climbing French sport/American YDS grades, but because of the different types of climbing (and particularly the sequences of movements), they are only ever indicative and can vary by several levels between versions; an example is provided in the table below from a report by the Club Alpino Italiano for the International Climbing and Mountaineering Federation from 2016.

American V-Grade	French Font Grade	Japanese Dankyū grade	~American YDS	~French sport
VB−	2	10-kyū	<5.4	<4
VB	3	9-kyū	<5.6/5.7	<5a/5b+
V0−	4−	8-kyū	5.8	5c
V0	4	7-kyū	5.9	6a/6a+
V0+	4+	6-kyū	5.10a/b	6a+/6b
V1	5	5-kyū	5.10c/d	6b/6b+
V2	5+	4-kyū	5.10d/5.11a/b	6b+/6c
V3	6A		5.11c	6c+
	6A+	3-kyū	5.11d	7a
V4	6B		5.12a	7a/7a+
	6B+	2-kyū		7a+
V5	6C		5.12b	7a+/7b
	6C+	1-kyū		7b
V6	7A		5.12c	7b+
V7	7A+	1-dan	5.12d	7b+/7c
V8	7B		5.13a	7c/7c+
	7B+	2-dan	5.13b	7c+/8a
V9	7C		5.13c	8a/8a+
V10	7C+	3-dan	5.13d	8b
V11	8A		5.14a	8b+
V12	8A+	4-dan	5.14b	8c
V13	8B		5.14c	8c+
V14	8B+	5-dan	5.14d	9a
V15	8C		5.15a	9a+
V16	8C+	6-dan	5.15b	9b
V17	9A		5.15c	9b+
V18	9A+	7-dan	5.15d	9c

Main sources: RockFax Bouldering Grade Table (2021), theCrag (2023),, and UIAA (2016).

=== Mountaineering comparison ===
As of 2023, the Russian system can be compared to the French Alpine System (and the UIAA Scale of Overall Difficulty), in the following way:

Russian	French Alpine System	UIAA Overall Alpine
1A	F	I
1B	F+/PD−	I/II
2A	PD	II
2B	PD+/AD−	II/III
3A	AD	III
3B	AD+/D−	III/IV
4A	D	IV
4B	D+	IV/V
5A	TD	V
5B	TD+/ED1	V/VI
6A	ED1/ED2 (the old ED)	VI
6B	ED2 (the old ED+)	VII

Main source: UIAA (2016)

== See also ==
- Beta (climbing)
- History of rock climbing
- Trail difficulty rating system
