= Jūji Tanabe =

Japanese literature scholar, teacher, and mountain climber

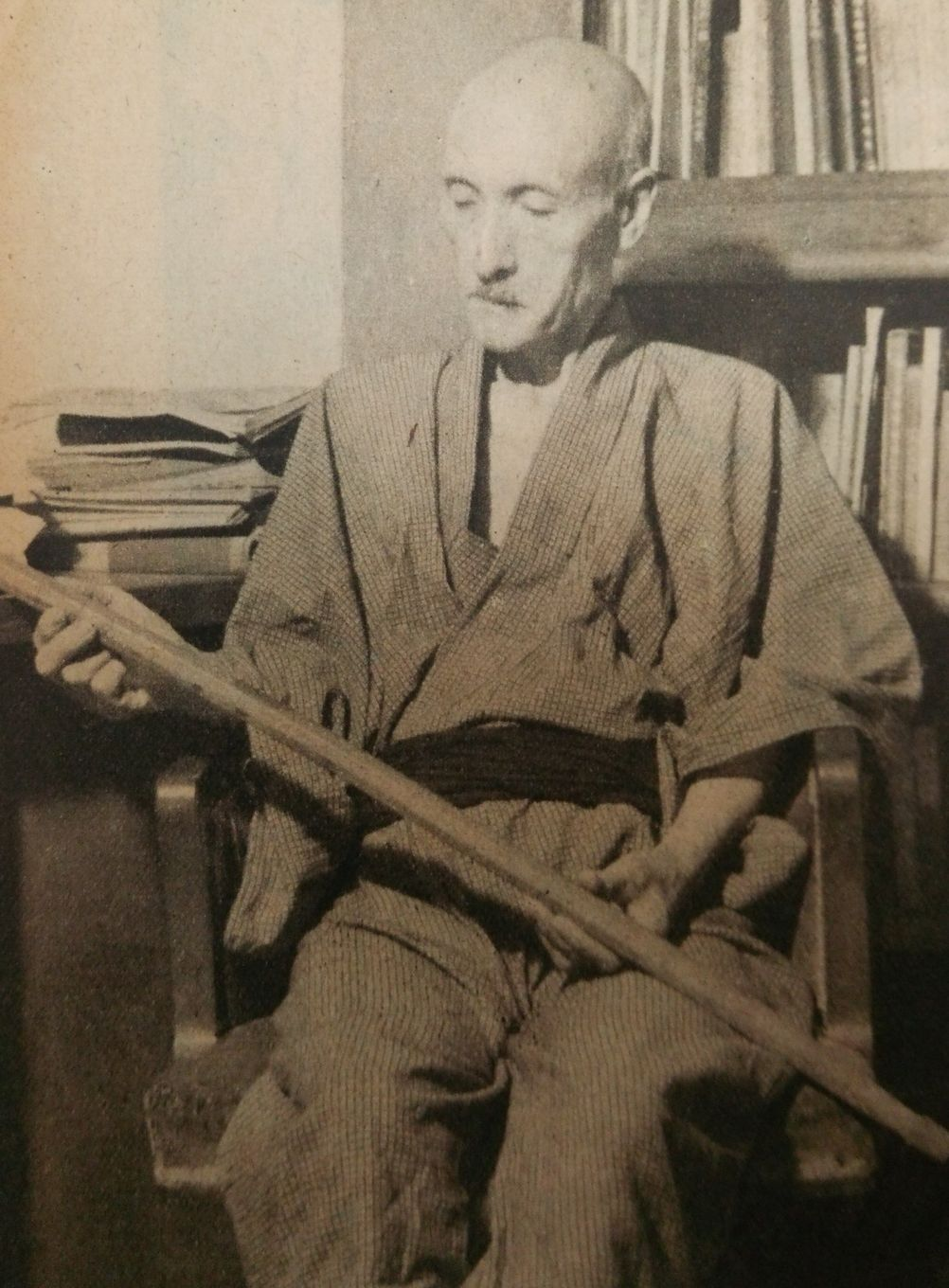
- Born: August 4, 1884
- Died: September 22, 1972 (aged 88)

Jūji Tanabe (Japanese: 田部 重治, Hepburn: Tanabe Jūji); August 4, 1884 – September 22, 1972) was a Japanese literature scholar, teacher, and mountain climber.

Tanabe was born in Toyama City. He majored in English literature at Tokyo Imperial University, specializing in William Wordsworth. He lectured at Toyo University and Hosei University.

He climbed the Japanese Alps and Okuchichibu Mountains. He is the author of the book The Japanese Alps and A Pilgrimage to Chichibu (日本アルプスと秩父巡礼, Nippon Alps to Chichibu Junrei) in 1919, which was republished as Mountains and Ravines (山と渓谷, Yama to Keikoku) in 1930.

Tanabe and his friend Kogure Ritarō's (1873–1944) accounts of the Okuchichibu Mountains have become influential. There is a monument to them at the foot of the Mt. Kimpu (金峰山; 2599 m).
