= 11133 Kumotori =

Main-belt background asteroid

Discovery
- Discovered by: T. Kobayashi
- Discovery site: Ōizumi Obs.
- Discovery date: 2 December 1996

Designations
- Named after: Mount Kumotori (Japanese mountain)
- Alternative designations: 1996 XY
- Minor planet category: main-belt · (outer) background

Orbital characteristics
- Epoch 23 March 2018 (JD 2458200.5)
- Uncertainty parameter 0
- Observation arc: 28.27 yr (10,324 d)
- Aphelion: 2.9313 AU
- Perihelion: 2.6210 AU
- Semi-major axis: 2.7762 AU
- Eccentricity: 0.0559
- Orbital period (sidereal): 4.63 yr (1,690 d)
- Mean anomaly: 54.098°
- Mean motion: 0° 12^{m} 47.16^{s} / day
- Inclination: 10.689°
- Longitude of ascending node: 83.096°
- Argument of perihelion: 158.34°

Physical characteristics
- Mean diameter: 8.96 km (calculated)
- Synodic rotation period: 4.634±0.0005 h
- Geometric albedo: 0.057 (assumed)
- Spectral type: L · C (assumed)
- Absolute magnitude (H): 13.517±0.003 (R); 13.6 · 13.97; 14.10±0.46

11133 Kumotori (provisional designation 1996 XY) is a background asteroid from the central regions of the asteroid belt, approximately 9 kilometers (6 miles) in diameter. It was discovered on 2 December 1996, by Japanese amateur astronomer Takao Kobayashi at his Ōizumi Observatory. The asteroid was named after Mount Kumotori near Tokyo. It has a rotation period of 4.6 hours.

== Orbit and classification ==
Kumotori is a non-family asteroid from the main belt's background population. It orbits the Sun in the central main-belt at a distance of 2.6–2.9 AU once every 4 years and 8 months (1,690 days; semi-major axis of 2.786 AU). Its orbit has an eccentricity of 0.06 and an inclination of 11° with respect to the ecliptic. The asteroid was first observed at Palomar Observatory in March 1989. The body's observation arc begins with its official discovery observation at Oizumi.

== Physical characteristics ==
Kumotori has been characterized as a rare L-type asteroid by Pan-STARRS' survey. It is also assumed to be a carbonaceous C-type asteroid.

=== Rotation period ===
In April 2012, a rotational lightcurve of Kumotori was obtained from photometric observations in the R-band by astronomers at the Palomar Transient Factory in California. Lightcurve analysis gave a rotation period of 4.634 hours with a brightness amplitude of 0.33 magnitude (U=2).

=== Diameter and albedo ===
The Collaborative Asteroid Lightcurve Link assumes an albedo for a carbonaceous asteroid of 0.057 and calculates a diameter of 8.96 kilometers based on an absolute magnitude of 13.97.

== Naming ==
This minor planet was named after Mount Kumotori (雲取山 Kumotori-san). With an altitude of 2,017 metres (6,617 ft), it is the highest peak in the Tokyo metropolitan area, located at the boundary between Tokyo and Saitama and considered to be one of the 100 most celebrated mountains of Japan. The official naming citation was published by the Minor Planet Center on 9 November 2003 (M.P.C. 50251).
