= Okuchichibu Mountains =

Mountainous area in Kantō and Kōshin'etsu regions, Japan

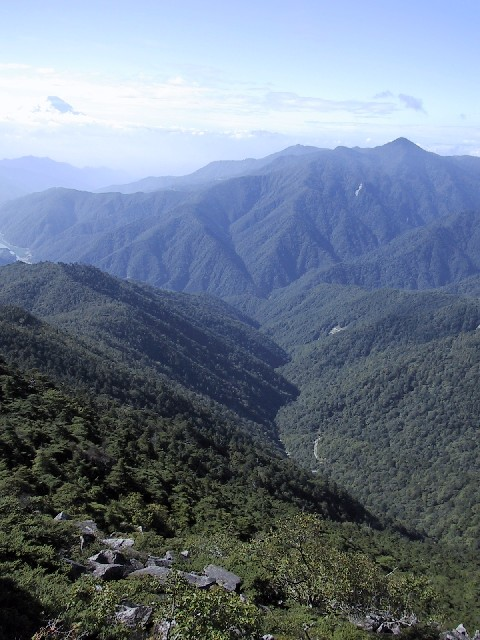
- View of Okuchichibu Mountains.

Highest point
- Peak: Mt. Kita Okusenjō (北奥千丈岳, Kita Okusenjō-dake)
- Elevation: 2,601 m (8,533 ft)

Naming
- Native name: 奥秩父山地 (Japanese); Okuchichibu Sanchi (Japanese)

Geography
- Location within Japan
- Country: Japan
- Region(s): Kantō region and Kōshin'etsu region
- Range coordinates: 35°52′07″N 138°40′15″E

Okuchichibu Mountains (奥秩父山塊, Okuchichibu Sankai) or the Okuchichibu Mountainous Region (奥秩父山地, Okuchichibu Sanchi) is a mountainous district in the Kantō region and Kōshin'etsu region, Japan. It covers the western part of Tokyo, the western part of Saitama Prefecture, the southwestern part of Gunma Prefecture, the southeastern part of Nagano Prefecture, and the northern part of Yamanashi Prefecture. Oku (奥, oku) means the interior, Okuchichibu means the interior of Chichibu (秩父, chichibu). The meaning of the word Okuchichibu is based on the point of view from the Kantō region. This mountain area consists of folded mountains and ranges from 1000 to 2600 meters in height. Mount Kita Okusenjō (北奥千丈岳, Kita Okusenjō-dake) is the highest at 2601m. Most of the range lies in the Chichibu Tama Kai National Park (秩父多摩甲斐国立公園, Chichibu Tama Kai Kokuritsu Kōen).

Some of the mountains in the Okuchichibu Mountains include:

- Mt. Kumotori (雲取山, Kumotori-yama) (2017 m)
- Mt. Hiryū (飛竜山, Hiryū-san) (2077 m)
- Mt. Karamatsuo (唐松尾山, Karamatsuo-san) (2109 m)
- Mt. Kasatori (笠取山, Kasatori-san) (1953 m)
- Mt. Suisho (水晶山, Suisho-san) (2158 m)
- Karisaka Pass (雁坂峠, Karisaka Tōge) (2082 m)
- Mt. Tokusa (木賊山, Tokusa-yama) (2468 m)
- Mt. Kobushi (甲武信ヶ岳, Kōbushi-dake) (2475 m)
- Mt. Sanpō (三宝山, Sanpō-zan) (2483 m)
- Mt. Kokushi (国師岳, Kokushi-dake) (2591 m)
- Mt. Kita Okusenjō (北奥千丈岳, Kita Okusenjō-dake) (2601 m)
- Mt. Asahi (朝日岳, Asahi-dake) (2579 m)
- Mt. Kinpu (金峰山, Kinpu-san) (2599 m)
- Mt. Mizugaki (瑞牆山, Mizugaki-yama) (2230 m)
- Mt. Ogawa (小川山, Ogawa-yama) (2418 m)
- Mt. Yokō (横尾山, Yokō-san) (1818 m)
- Mt. Meshimori (飯盛山, Meshimori-san) (1643 m)
- Mt. Azumaya (四阿屋山, Azumaya-san) (772 m)
- Mt. Ryōkami (両神山, Ryōkami-san) (1723 m)
- Mt. Nanten (南天山, Nanten-san) (1483 m)
- Mt. Chichibu-ontake (秩父御岳山, Chichibu Ontake-san) (1081 m)
- Nakatsu Valley (中津峡, Nakatsu-kyō)
- Mt. Mitsumine (三峰山, Mitsumine-san)
  - (Mt. Myōhō 1332 m, Mt. Shiraiwa 1921 m, Mt. Kumotori 2017 m)
- Mt. Hakutai (白泰山, Hakutai-san) (1794 m)
- Mt. Myōhō (妙法が岳, Myōhō-san) (1332 m)
- Mt. Kirimo (霧藻ヶ峰, Kirimogamine) (1523 m)
- Mt. Shiraiwa (白岩山, Shiraiwa-san) (1921 m)
- Mt. Kumakura (熊倉山, Kumakura-san) (1427 m)
- Mt. Wanakura (和名倉山, Wanakura-san) (2036 m)
- Mikuni Pass (三国峠, Mikuni Tōge) (1740 m)
- Jūmonji Pass (十文字峠, Jūmonji Tōge) (2000 m)
- Mt. Gorō (五郎山, Gorō-san) (2132 m)
- Nishizawa Gorge (西沢渓谷, Nishizawa Keikoku)
- Higashizawa Gorge (東沢渓谷, Higashizawa Keikoku)
- Mt. Kurogane (黒金山, Kurogane-san) (2232 m)
- Mt. Kentoku (乾徳山, Kentoku-san) (2031 m)
- Mt. Kurakake (倉掛山, Kurakake-san) (1777 m)
- Mikubo Plateau (三窪高原, Mikubo Kōgen) (1650 m)
Okuchichibu Mountains Views
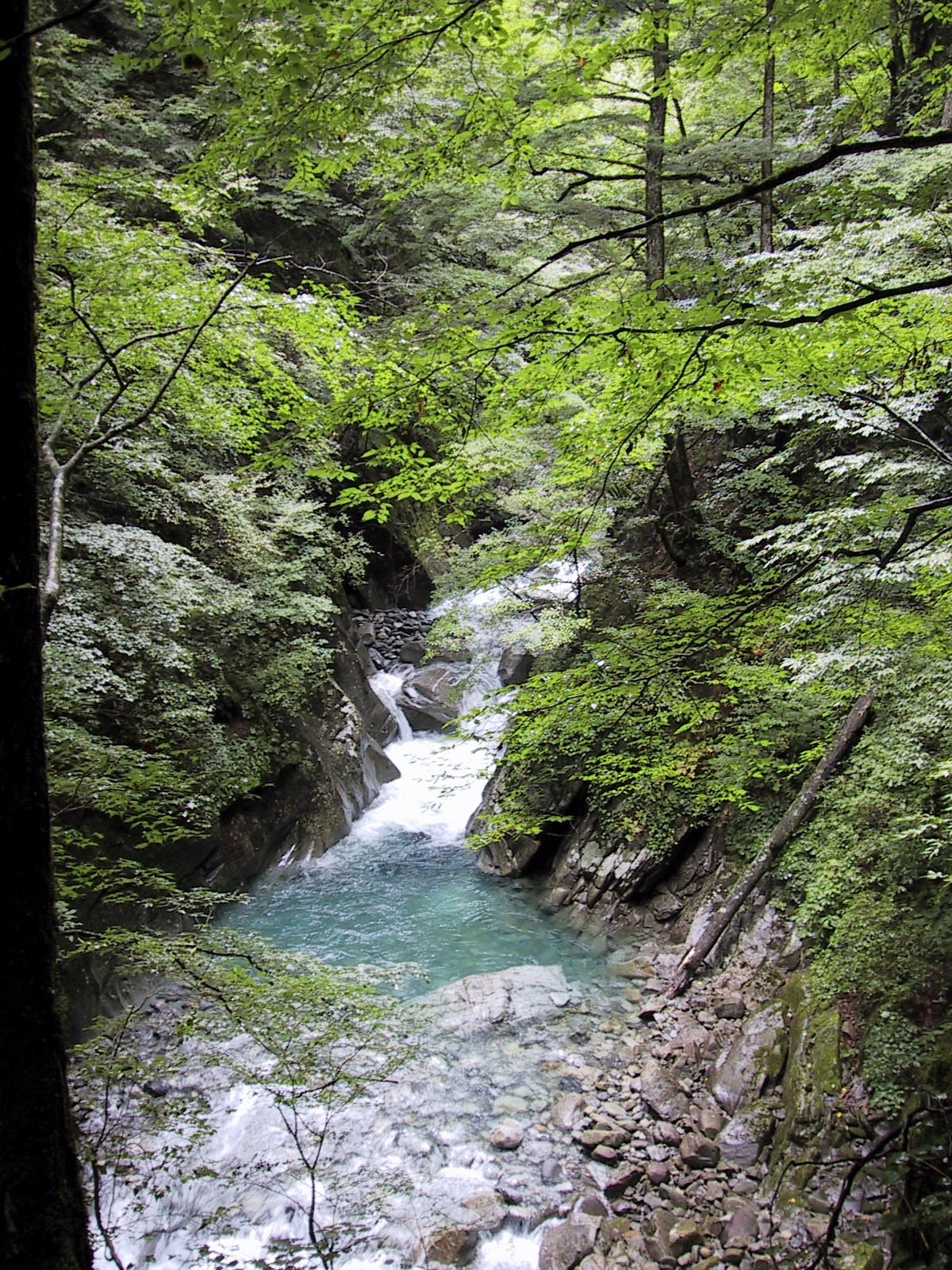
Higashizawa Valley.

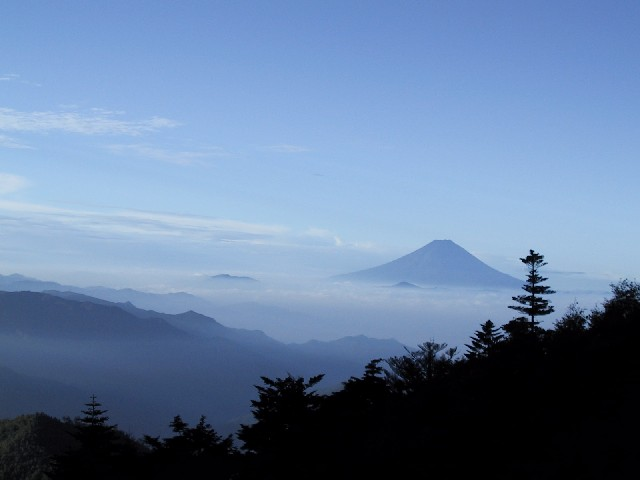
Mt.Fuji from Okuchichibu.

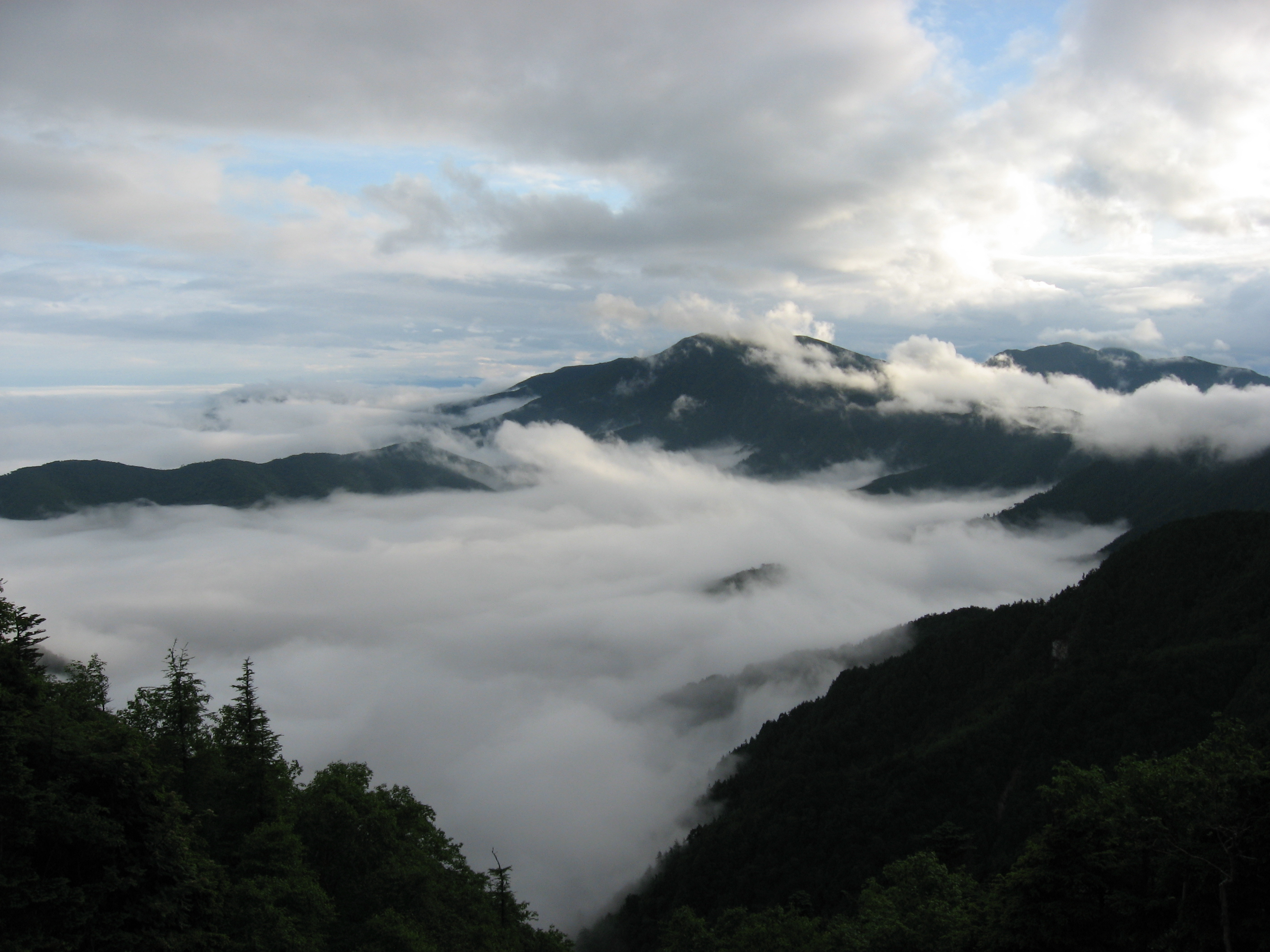
Cloud cover.

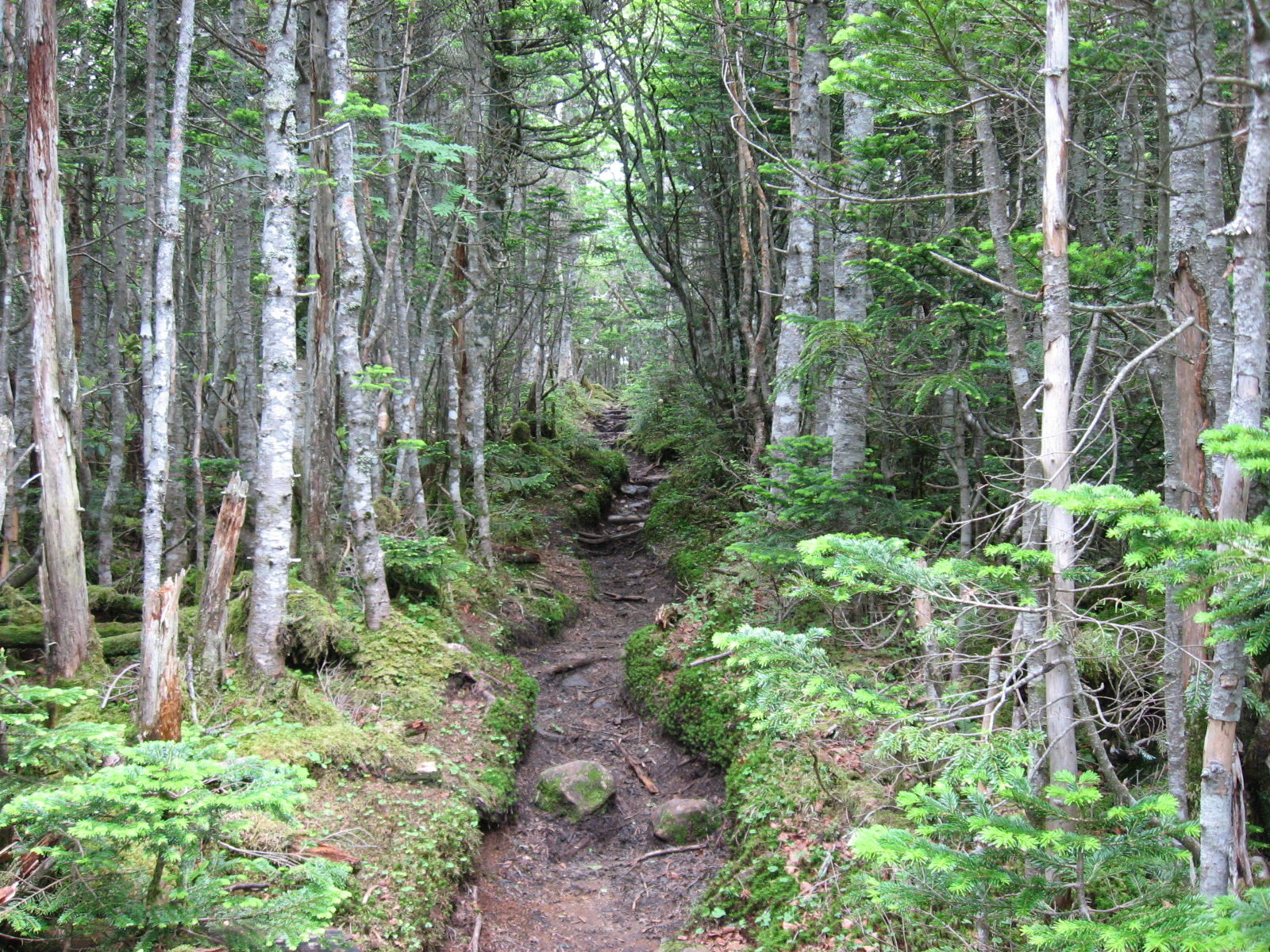
In the mountain.

== See also ==
- Tanabe Jyuji
