= Ogawayama =

Mountain in Yamanashi Prefecture, Japan

Mount Ogawa
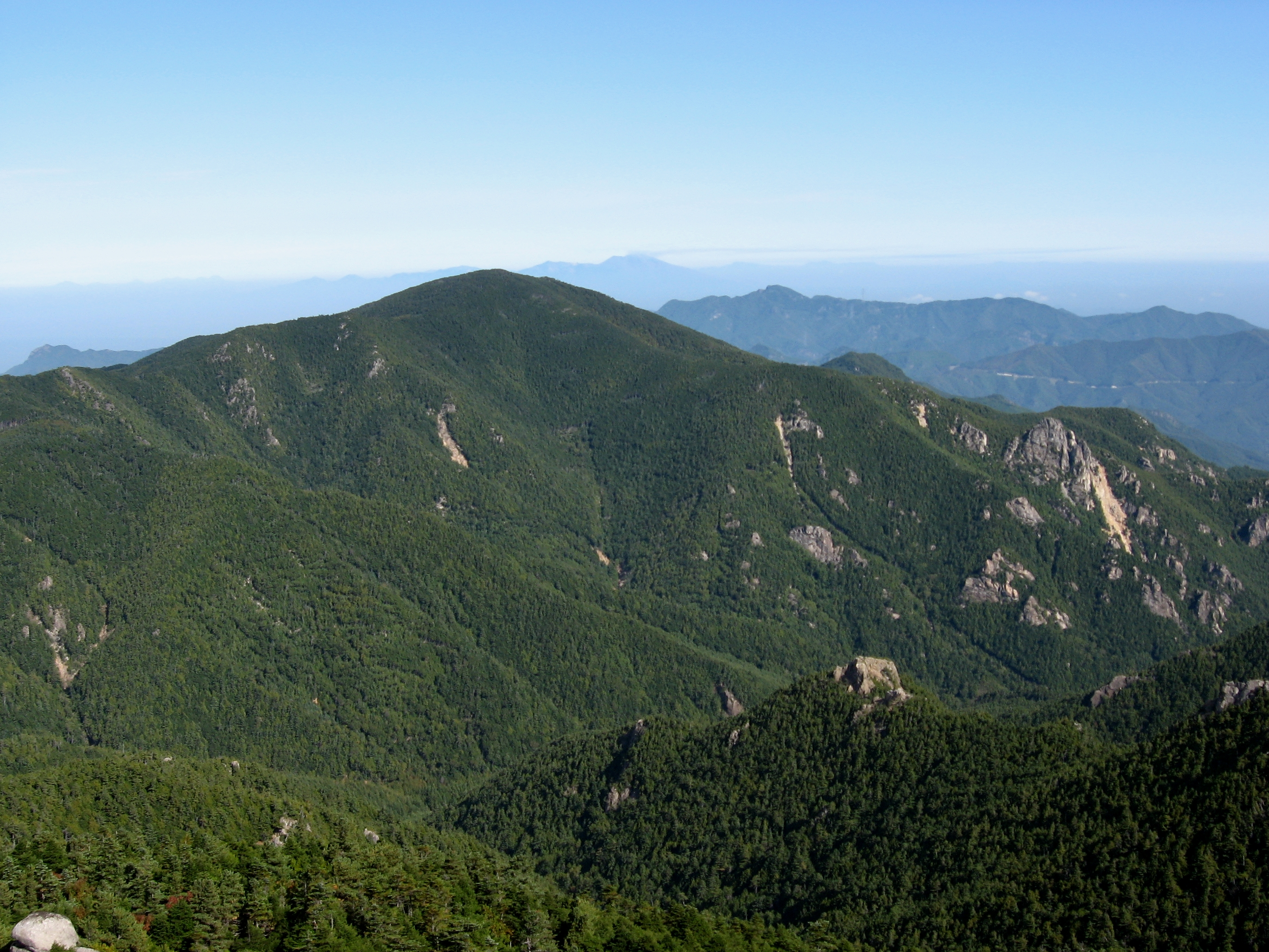
- A view from Mt. Kinpu

Highest point
- Elevation: 2,418 m (7,933 ft)
- Coordinates: 35°54′33″N 138°36′44″E

Naming
- Native name: 小川山 (Japanese)

Geography
- Location within Japan
- Location: Yamanashi / Nagano, Japan
- Parent range: Okuchichibu Mountains

Ogawayama (小川山) is a 2,418m tall mountain on the border of Nagano and Yamanashi prefectures in Japan. It is a famous rock climbing area. The rock in Ogawayama consists of granite.

Some famous boulders can be found in Ogawayama. Such as Captain Ahab, the first boulder problem opened in Japan in 1980, and the notorious Banshousha slab boulder. There is multipitch climbing up to 9 pitches. The routes are generally not bolted.
