= Mount Kumotori =

Mountain in Japan

- 雲取山
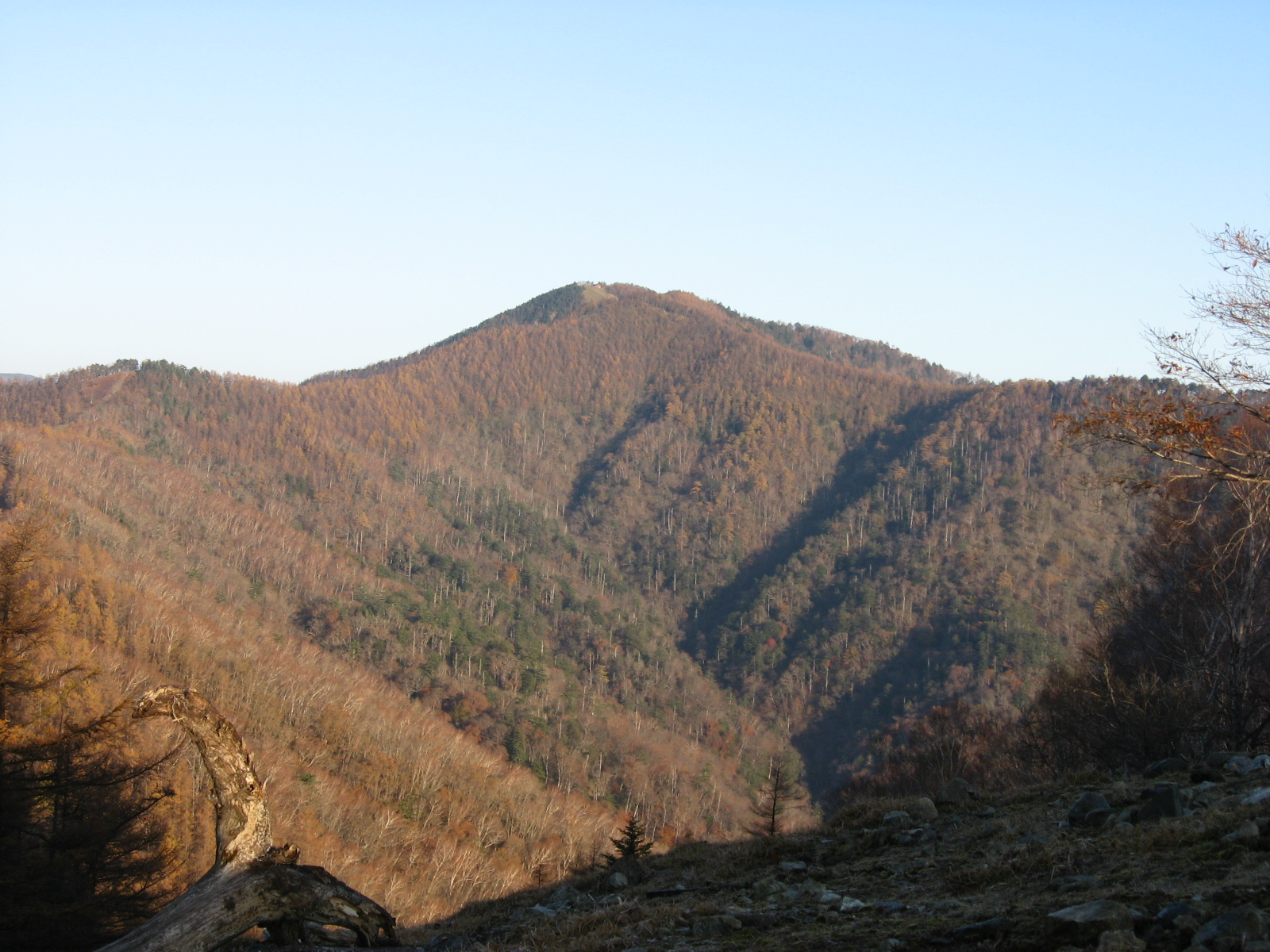
- Viewed from the southeast

Highest point
- Elevation: 2,017 m (6,617 ft)
- Coordinates: 35°51′19″N 138°56′37″E

Geography
- Location within Japan
- Location: Boundary of Tokyo, Saitama, and Yamanashi Prefectures, Honshū, Japan
- Parent range: Okutama Mountains, Okuchichibu Mountains

Climbing
- Easiest route: Hiking

Mount Kumotori (雲取山, Kumotori-san) stands at the boundary of Tokyo, Saitama, and Yamanashi Prefectures on the island of Honshū, Japan. With an elevation of 2,017 metres (6,617 ft), its summit is the highest point in Tokyo. It separates the Okutama Mountains and the Okuchichibu Mountains. While it marks the end of the Ishione (石尾根) mountain ridge that begins near the JR Oku-Tama Station, the highest mountain ridge in Tokyo, its remote location amongst a group of mountains from both mountain ranges makes access difficult.

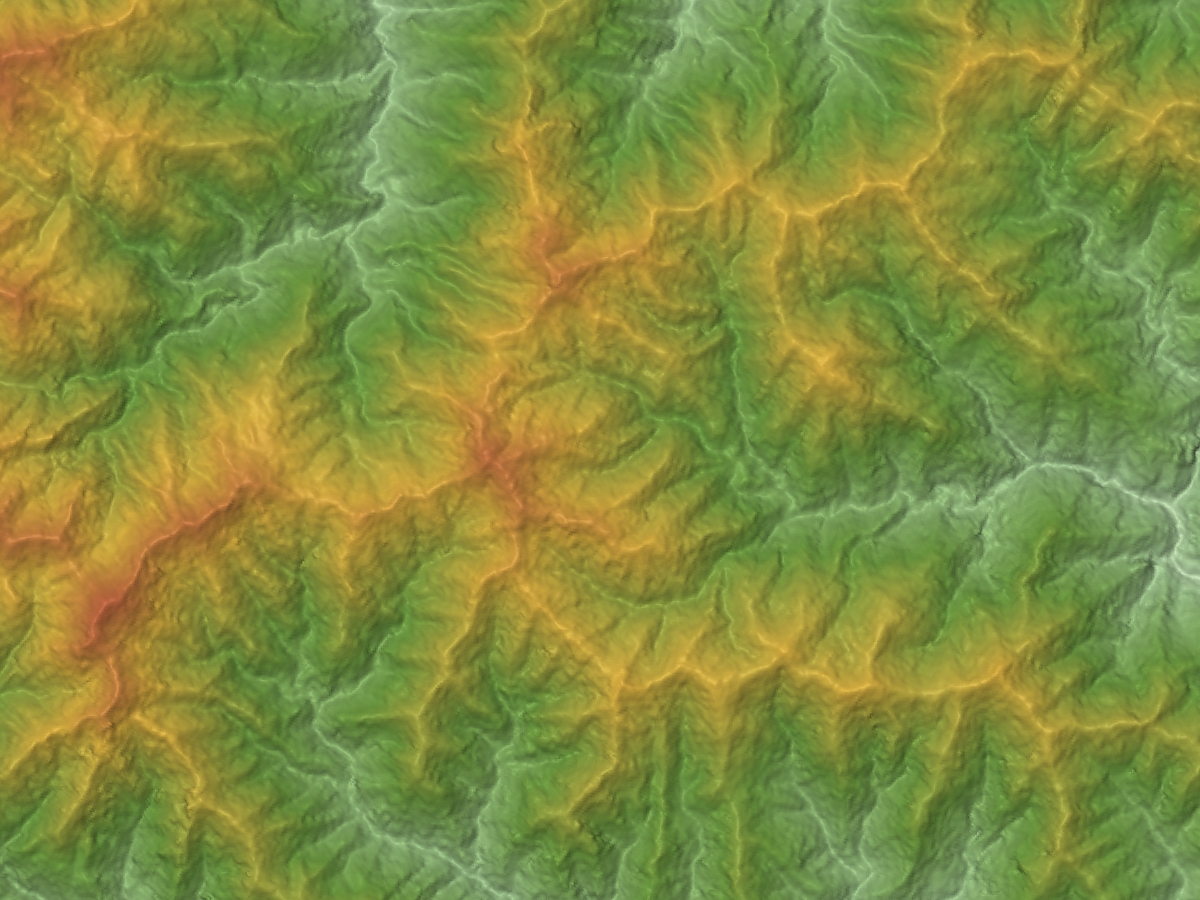
Relief map of around Mt. Kumotori

Kumotori-san features an "emergency" hut sometimes used by hikers as overnight shelter. Hikers not used to the altitude (if coming from Tokyo) may prefer overnighting at a lower elevation. The top of Kumotori-san, in good weather, offers a splendid view of Mount Fuji.

The prominence of the mountain in the region resulted in its summit being established as a fixed first-class triangulation point. As the triangulation point was established in December 1882, this was also one of the earliest ones established in Japan.

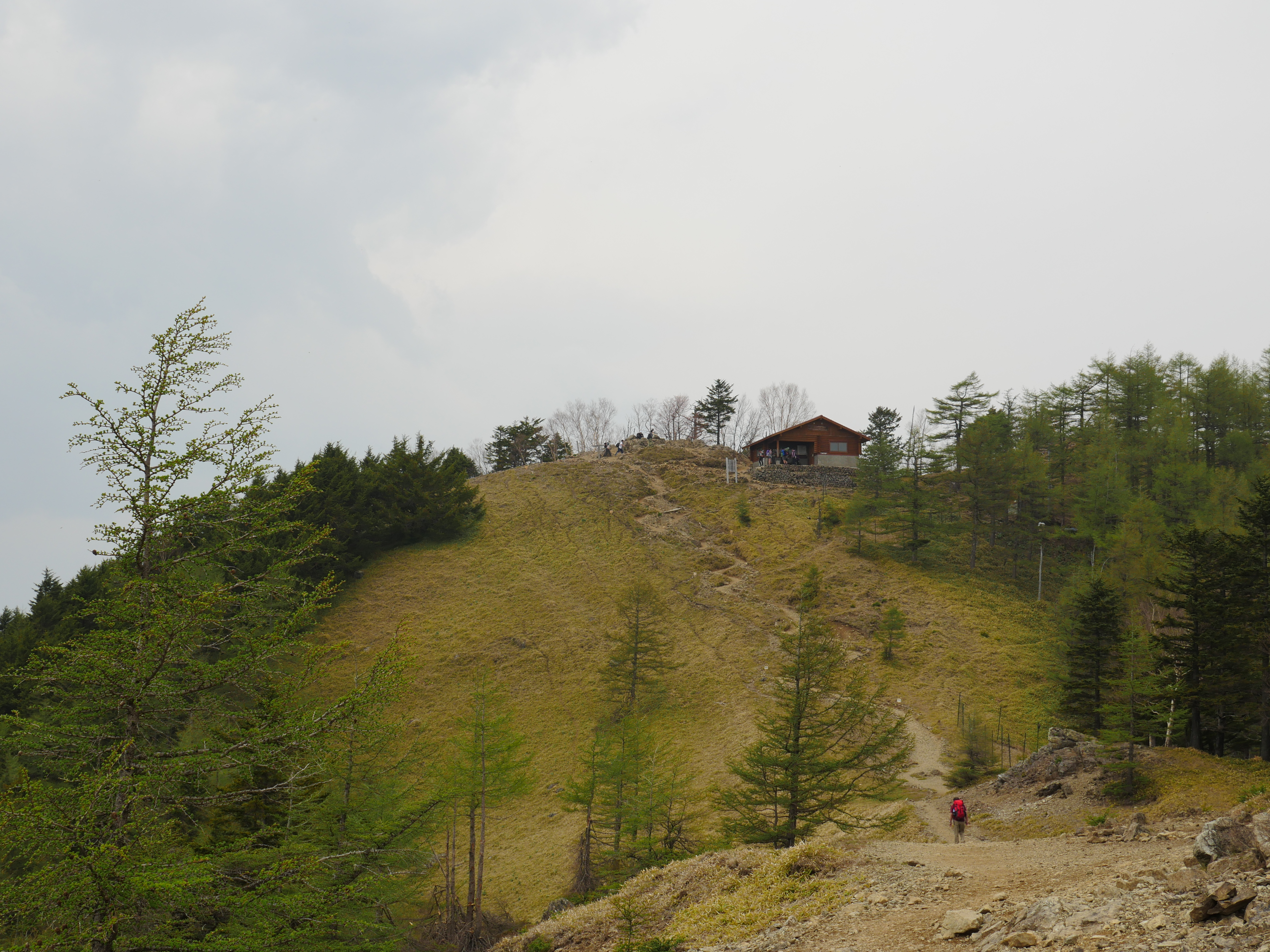
Top of Mount Kumotori

Kumotori is one of the 100 Famous Mountains of Japan.

== See also ==
- Okutama
- Okuchichibu Mountains
- List of the 100 famous mountains in Japan
