= Archelochus =

Greek mythical character

In Greek mythology, Archelochus (Ancient Greek: Ἀρχέλοχος) was a son of Antenor and Theano. Along with his brother, Acamas, and Aeneas, he shared the command of the Dardanians fighting on the side of the Trojans.

== Family ==
Archelochus was the brother of Crino, Acamas, Agenor, Antheus, Coön, Demoleon, Eurymachus, Glaucus, Helicaon, Iphidamas, Laodamas, Laodocus, Medon, Polybus and Thersilochus

== Mythology ==
One scholiast suggests that Priam, because he did not fully trust Aeneas, chose the sons of Antenor, Archelochus and Acamas, to command alongside him.

According to the Iliad, when the Trojan army was broken up into five divisions Archelochus was one of the three leaders of his division along with the other two Dardanian leaders. Later in the poem he is killed by Ajax son of Telamon, when the latter throws a spear at Polydamas but it misses the intended target and instead hits Archelochus in the neck:

"Swiftly then he [Ajax] cast with his bright spear at the other, even as he was drawing back. And Polydamas himself escaped black fate, springing to one side; but Archelochus, son of Antenor, received the spear; for to him the gods purposed death. Him the spear smote at the joining of head and neck on the topmost joint of the spine, and it shore off both the sinews. And far sooner did his head and mouth and nose reach the earth as he fell, than his legs and knees."

His death was considered avenged when his brother, Acamas, slew Promachus the Boeotian.
