= Antenor (Trojan) =

Advisor to Priam in Greek mythology

- Trojan Elder
- Member of the Trojan Royal Family
- Abode: Troy

Genealogy
- Parents: (1) Aesyetes and Cleomestra (2) Hicetaon
- Siblings: (1) Assaracus and Alcathous (2) Melanippus, Critolaus and Thymoetes
- Consort: (i) Theano (ii) unknown
- Children: (i) Archelochus, Acamas, Glaucus, Helicaon, Hippolochus, Laodocus, Polybus, Agenor, Antheus, Iphidamas, Coön, Laodamas, Demoleon, Eurymachus, Medon, Thersilochus and Crino (ii) Pedaeus

In Greek mythology, Antenor (Ancient Greek:Ancient Greek: Ἀντήνωρ, romanized: Antḗnōr, lit. 'against man' or 'instead of a man') was a counselor to King Priam of Troy during the events of the Trojan War.

== Description ==
Antenor was described by the chronicler Malalas in his account of the Chronography as "tall, thin, white, blond, small-eyed, hook-nosed, crafty, cowardly, secure, a story-teller, eloquent". Meanwhile, in the account of Dares the Phrygian, he was illustrated as "... tall, graceful, swift, crafty, and cautious."

== Family ==
Antenor was variously named as the son of the Dardanian noble Aesyetes by Cleomestra or of Hicetaon. He was the husband of Theano, daughter of Cisseus of Thrace, who bore him at least one daughter, Crino, and 50 sons, including Acamas, Agenor, Antheus, Archelochus, Coön, Demoleon, Eurymachus, Glaucus, Helicaon, Hippolochus, Iphidamas, Laodamas, Laodocus, Medon, Polybus and Thersilochus (most of whom perished during the Trojan War). He was also the father of a bastard son, Pedaeus, by an unknown woman. Some writers also include him as the father of Polydamas, who is otherwise a son of Panthous, as well as Laocoön.

The Suda further mentions an unnamed daughter of Antenor, who was a lover of Apollo and turned by him into a puppy, after which they had a son named Telmessos, a seer and namesake of a city in Lycia. Another unnamed son is mentioned as having been sent to Delphi to inquire an oracle, but was captivated by the beauty of Panthous and carried him to Troy.

According to numerous scholars, Antenor was actually related to Priam.

Comparative table of Antenor's family
Relation	Names	Sources								
Relation	Names	Homer		Virgil	Apollodorus	Pausanias	Dictys	Tzetzes	Eustathius	Others
Parentage	Aesyetes and Cleomestra						✓			
Parentage	Hicetaon								✓	
Spouse	Theano	✓			✓					
Spouse	Unknown		✓							
Children	Crino					✓				
Children	Archelochus	✓			✓			✓		
Children	Acamas	✓			✓			✓		
Children	Glaucus	✓		✓	✓	✓	✓			
Children	Helicaon	✓								
Children	Laodocus	✓								
Children	Pedaeus		✓							
Children	Coön	✓								
Children	Polybus	✓						✓		
Children	Agenor	✓						✓		
Children	Iphidamas	✓				✓				
Children	Laodamas	✓						✓		
Children	Demoleon	✓								
Children	Eurymachus					✓				
Children	Medon			✓						
Children	Thersilochus			✓						
Children	Antheus							✓		
Children	Hippolochus							✓		
Children	Laocoön							✓		
Children	Polydamas									✓

== Mythology ==
Antenor was one of the wisest of the Trojan elders and counsellors. In the Homeric account of the Trojan War, Antenor advised the Trojans to return Helen to her husband and otherwise proved sympathetic to a negotiated peace with the Greeks. In later developments of the myths, particularly per Dares and Dictys, Antenor was made an open traitor, unsealing the city gates to the enemy. As payment, his house—marked by a panther skin over the door—was spared during the sack of the city.

His subsequent fate varied across the authors. He was said to have rebuilt a city on the site of Troy; to have settled at Cyrene; the shore of the Tyrrhenian Sea; or to have founded Patavium (modern Padua), Korčula, or other cities in eastern Italy. According to the origin legend of the Franks (according to the 'Liber historiae Francorum' and the 'Grandes Chroniques de France'), he is said to have led a group of Trojans north and settled near the Maeotian Swamp, and the Maeotian lake, now known as the Sea of Azov. Other sources such as the 'Compendium sive breviarium primi voluminis annalium sive historiarum de origine regum et gentis Francorum' of Johannes Trithemius attempt to show that they are the same as the Cimmerians.

== In literature ==
- Antenor appears briefly in Homer's Iliad. In Book 3 he is present when Helen identifies for Priam each of the Greek warriors from the wall of Troy; when she describes Odysseus, Antenor confirmed her account, alluded to how he entertained Odysseus and Menelaus and got to know both.
  On this Antenor said, "Madam, you have spoken truly. Ulysses once came here as envoy about yourself, and Menelaus with him. I received them in my own house, and therefore know both of them by sight and conversation. When they stood up in presence of the assembled Trojans, Menelaus was the broader shouldered, but when both were seated Ulysses had the more royal presence. After a time they delivered their message, and the speech of Menelaus ran trippingly on the tongue; he did not say much, for he was a man of few words, but he spoke very clearly and to the point, though he was the younger man of the two; Ulysses, on the other hand, when he rose to speak, was at first silent and kept his eyes fixed upon the ground. There was no play nor graceful movement of his sceptre; he kept it straight and stiff like a man unpractised in oratory- one might have taken him for a mere churl or simpleton; but when he raised his voice, and the words came driving from his deep chest like winter snow before the wind, then there was none to touch him, and no man thought further of what he looked like."
  In the same book, he accompanied Priam to the front line and bore witness of the King's speech before the duel between Menelaus and his son, Paris. In Book 7, as mentioned above, he advises the Trojans to give Helen back, but Paris refuses to yield.
- A dithyramb by Bacchylides called The Sons of Antenor, or The Request for the Return of Helen, exists only in fragments but seems to have covered the embassy mentioned above.
- Sophocles wrote a now lost play also called The Sons of Antenor, which may have dealt with the history of Antenor and his family after the Trojan War.
- Roman playwright Lucius Accius wrote a lost tragedy called The Sons of Antenor. It has been suggested by Otto Ribbeck that this play covered the arrival of Pylaemenes to Troy and his subsequent death, leading to his group of Eneti to follow Antenor as they flee the city's destruction.
- Antenor is mentioned in Vergil's Aeneid in book 1, line 243, when Venus tells Jupiter that Antenor had escaped from the fall of Troy and founded Patavium, modern Padua.
- In Dictys Cretensis' Ephemeris belli Troiani, Antenor and Aeneas betray the Trojans to help the Greeks, ruling over the remains of Troy once the Greeks have left.
- In Dares Phrygius' de excidio Trojae historia, Antenor betrays Troy to the Greeks.
- In Geoffrey of Monmouth's Historia Regum Britanniae, Antenor and his followers were banished from Troy, and settled on the shore of the Tyrrhenian Sea; Brutus of Troy later discovers several nations descended from them living there, led by Corineus.
- In Geoffrey Chaucer's Troilus and Criseyde, Antenor appears as a minor, non-speaking, character who has been taken prisoner by the Greeks but is returned by them in exchange for Criseyde.
- The circle Antenora is named after him in the poem Inferno in Dante Alighieri's Divine Comedy. It is located in Hell's Circle of Treachery which is reserved for traitors of cities, countries, and political parties.
- Antenor is one of the characters in Jan Kochanowski's tragedy The Dismissal of the Greek Envoys, set before the Trojan War.
- Antenor appears as a character in William Shakespeare's play Troilus and Cressida, set during the Trojan War.
- Antenor is the titular character of Pedro Montegon's El Antenor, a Spanish 1788 epic romance concerning his adventures after the fall of Troy.
- Antenor is ironically misidentified by Albert Bloch, a bumbling, pretentious character in Marcel Proust's novel The Guermantes Way (Le Côté de Guermantes) as the son of the river god Alpheus, probably confusing him with Antinous, with whom Alpheus is associated.

== In history ==
Mikhail Lomonosov in his "Ancient Russian History" deduced Antenor as a progenitor of the Slavs and Russians: "Cato has the same in mind when the Venetians, as Pliny testifies, are descended from the Trojans tribe. All this the great and authoritative historian Titus Livy shows and carefully explains. "Antenor," he writes, "came after many wanderings to the inner extremity of the Adriatic gulf with a multitude of the Enenites, who had been driven out of Paphlagonia and at Troy had lost their king Pilimenes: to move to that place they sought a leader. After the expulsion of the Euganeans, who lived between the sea and the Alpine mountains, the Henites and Trojans occupied these lands. That is why the name of the settlement was Troy, and the whole nation was called the Venetians".

== Eponym ==
The minor planet 2207 Antenor, discovered in 1977 by Soviet astronomer Nikolai Stepanovich Chernykh, is named after him.
