= Agenor of Troy =

Trojan warrior in the Iliad

In Greek mythology, Agenor (/əˈdʒiːnɔːr/; Ancient Greek: Ἀγήνωρ or Αγήνορι, romanized: Agēnor, lit. 'heroic, manly') was a Trojan hero.

== Family ==
Agenor was the son of Antenor and Theano, daughter of King Cisseus of Thrace. His siblings were Acamas, Antheus, Archelochus, Coön, Demoleon, Eurymachus, Glaucus, Helicaon, Hippolochus, Iphidamas, Laodamas, Laodocus, Medon, Polybus Thersilochus and Crino.

== Mythology ==
When Achilles was routing the entire Trojan army, Agenor was the first Trojan to collect his wits and stop fleeing from Achilles' rampage. Agenor felt ashamed that he was fleeing from a man who was supposedly just as mortal as anyone so he turned to face Achilles. As the Greek hero approached Agenor the latter threw his spear at him, but only hit Achilles' greaves. After that Achilles sprang at Agenor, but at that moment Apollo carried the Trojan away in a veil of mist to keep Achilles from pursuing him, while Apollo took the form of Agenor to lead Achilles away from the Trojans. This act allowed all the Trojans (except Hector) to take cover behind the walls of Troy.

According to Hyginus, Agenor killed two people in the war, including Elephenor and Clonius. In the Posthomerica of Quintus Smyrnaeus, he is assigned four more kills. His son Echeclus was further killed by Achilles.

According to Pausanias, when the Achaeans were storming Troy through the Trojan Horse ruse, Agenor wounded the Theban hero Lycomedes in the wrist, but was later killed by Achilles' son Neoptolemus.

Agenor's picture appears in the great painting in the Lesche of Delphi, by Polygnotus.
