= Coön =

Ancient Greek mythology character

In Greek mythology, Coön (Ancient Greek: Κόων, gen. Κόωνος), also known as Cynon (Κύνων), was the eldest son of Antenor and Theano. Like most of his brothers, he fought and fell in the Trojan War.

== Family ==
Coön was the brother of Crino, Acamas, Agenor, Antheus, Archelochus, Demoleon, Eurymachus, Glaucus, Helicaon, Iphidamas, Laodamas, Laodocus, Medon, Polybus, and Thersilochus.

== Mythology ==
In the Iliad, he confronted Agamemnon over the body of his brother Iphidamas and wounded the opponent in the arm, but Agamemnon struck back and chopped Coön's head off. The fight between Agamemnon and Coön was depicted on the chest of Cypselus according to Pausanias.
