= Medon (mythology) =

List of mythical and historical people

In Greek mythology and history, Medon (/ˈmiːdən/; Ancient Greek: Μέδων, gen.: Μέδοντος, romanized: Médōn, lit. 'lord', 'ruler' or 'protector') is the name of a number of different figures:

- Medon, one of the Tyrrhenian pirates who attempted to enslave Dionysus and were changed into fish or dolphin.
- Medon, a centaur at the wedding of Pirithous and Hippodamia.
- Medon, one of the Dolionians, who was killed by the Argonauts.
- Medon, son of Eteoclus and accordingly a participant in the war of the Epigoni.
- Medon, the son of Pylades and Electra and brother of Strophius.
- Medon, one of the Achaean Leaders and half-brother of Ajax the Lesser. He was the son of Oileus, king of Locris, by Rhene or Alcimache. He lived in Phylace, to where he had to flee after he had killed a relative of his stepmother Eriopis. In the Trojan War, Medon took over Philoctetes' army after the latter was bitten by a snake and left on Lemnos because the wound festered and smelled bad. Medon was killed by Aeneas.
- Medon, a "cunning craftsman" of Cilla, husband of Iphianassa and father of Metalcas and Zechis, of whom the former was slain in the Trojan War by Neoptolemus, and the latter by Teucer.
- Medon, son of Antenor and Theano, thus brother of Crino, Acamas, Agenor, Antheus, Archelochus, Coön, Demoleon, Eurymachus, Glaucus, Helicaon, Iphidamas, Laodamas, Laodocus, Polybus and Thersilochus. Medon was killed by Philoctetes, and later Aeneas met him in the Underworld.
- Medon, the faithful herald of Odysseus in Homer's Odyssey. Following the advice of his son Telemachus, Odysseus spares Medon's life after killing the suitors of Penelope who had been plaguing his halls in his homeland of Ithaca. Medon attempts to return the favor by speaking on behalf of his master, claiming that Odysseus' violence was not unwarranted by the gods.
- Medon, the "cruel" suitor of Penelope who came from Dulichium along with other 56 wooers. He, with the other suitors, was slain by Odysseus with the aid of Eumaeus, Philoetius, and Telemachus.
- Medon (Μήδων), a son of Ceisus and grandson of Temenus. He was a king of Argos but his powers were limited to the minimum in favor of the people's self-government.
- Medon, son of Codrus, was the first archon of Athens. He was lame in one foot, which was why his brother Neileus would not let him rule, but the Delphian oracle bestowed the kingdom upon Medon.

== See also ==
- Medon (disambiguation)
