= Demoleon =

Trojan warrior in Greek mythology

In Greek mythology, Demoleon (Ancient Greek: Δημολέων) was a Trojan warrior, son of Antenor and Theano. His father was a counselor to King Priam and his mother was a priestess of Athena.

== Family ==
Demoleon was the brother of Crino, Acamas, Agenor, Antheus, Archelochus, Coön, Eurymachus, Glaucus, Helicaon, Iphidamas, Laodamas, Laodocus, Medon, Polybus, and Thersilochus. Demoleon was the grandson of Thracian king Cisseus and Telecleia through his maternal side.

== Mythology ==
Demoleon was a tough defensive fighter that was killed by Achilles during the Trojan War. Born into a peaceful family that believed that Helen should be sent back to the Greeks. His house was spared by the Achaeans because his family received Odysseus and Menelaus when they came to Troy as envoys. Demoleon's house was also spared by the Achaeans because his father pleaded with the Trojans to return Helen to the Greeks when Paris first stole her from Menelaus. It is believed that his family founded the city of Patavium (Padua) after fleeing Troy.

"…and over [the body of Iphition] Achilles killed Demoleon, a valiant champion of war and son to Antenor. He struck him on the temple through his bronze-cheeked helmet. The helmet did not stay the spear, but it went right on, crushing the bone so that the brain inside was shed in all directions, and his lust of fighting was ended."

== Namesake ==
- 18493 Demoleon, Jovian asteroid
