= Thersilochus =

Ancient Greek mythological figure

In Greek mythology, Thersilochus (Ancient Greek: Θερσίλοχος) may refer to three different figures:

- Thersilochus, the Trojan son of Antenor and Theano. His siblings were Crino, Acamas, Agenor, Antheus, Archelochus, Coön, Demoleon, Eurymachus, Glaucus, Helicaon, Iphidamas, Laodamas, Laodocus, Medon and Polybus. Thersilochus was slain by Achaean hero Achilles. Later Aeneas met him in the Underworld.
- Thersilochus, one of the Suitors of Penelope who came from Dulichium along with other 56 wooers. He, with the other suitors, was slain by Odysseus with the aid of Eumaeus, Philoetius, and Telemachus.
- Thersilochus, a soldier in Aeneas' army. He was killed by Turnus, the man who opposed Aeneas in Italy.

== Eponym ==
- 11509 Thersilochos, Jovian asteroid
