= Polybus (son of Antenor) =

Son of Antenor and Theano in Greek myth

In Greek mythology, Polybus (Ancient Greek: Πόλυβος) or Polybius was the son of Antenor and Theano. He was the brother of Crino, Acamas, Agenor, Antheus, Archelochus, Coön, Demoleon, Eurymachus, Glaucus, Helicaon, Iphidamas, Laodamas, Laodocus, Medon and Thersilochus. Polybus was killed in the Trojan War by Neoptolemus.
