= Helicaon =

Son of Antenor and Theano in Greek myth

In Greek mythology, Helicaon or Helikaon (Ancient Greek: Ἑλικάων) was a Trojan warrior and son of the elder Antenor and the priestess Theano. He was the brother of Crino, including Acamas, Agenor, Antheus, Archelochus, Coön, Demoleon, Eurymachus, Glaucus, Hippolochus, Hypsipylus, Iphidamas, Laodamas, Laodocus, Medon, Polybus, and Thersilochus.

Helicaon's wife Laodice, daughter of Priam, fell in love with Acamas. According to Lescheos, during the fall of Troy, he was wounded during the night battle and recognized by Odysseus, who, remembering the kindness shown to him by Helicaon's father, Antenor, carried him to safety. After the war, he accompanied Antenor, his mother Theano, and brother Polydamas with a group of Trojans and leaderless Eneti and, after defeating the Euganei of King Velesus, founded the city of Padua in Italy.

== Eponym ==
- 30942 Helicaon, Jovian asteroid
