= Laodamas =

Set of mythological Greek characters

Laodamas (/leɪˈɒdəməs/; Ancient Greek: Λᾱοδάμᾱς, romanized: Lāodámās, lit. 'tamer of the people') refers to five different people in Greek mythology.

- Laodamas, son of Eteocles, inherited Thebes from his father. In one version of the myth (different from the one recounted in Sophocles' Antigone), he was responsible for the deaths of his aunts Antigone and Ismene, whom he prosecuted for having buried Polynices. They sought refuge in the temple of Hera, but Laodamas set fire to it and thus killed them. During the battle of the Epigoni, he was killed by Alcmaeon after he killed Aegialeus. Other sources state that he survived and fled to the Encheleans in Illyria, and subsequently led an expedition to Thessaly.
- Laodamas, son of Antenor and Theano, thus brother of Crino, and numerous sons, including Acamas, Agenor, Antheus, Archelochus, Coön, Demoleon, Eurymachus, Glaucus, Helicaon, Iphidamas, Laodocus, Medon, Polybus and Thersilochus. Laodamas was a Trojan warrior killed by Ajax.
- Laodamas, a Lycian killed by Neoptolemus during the Trojan War.
- Laodamas, son of Hector and Andromache and brother of Astyanax. Unlike Astyanax, he was spared by the Greeks and stayed by his mother's side.
- Laodamas, a prince of Scheria as son of King Alcinous and Arete of the Phaecians. He was the brother of Nausicaa, Halius and Clytoneus. Alcinous gives Odysseus Laodamas's chair, "whence he bade his son give place, valiant Laodamas, who sat next him and was his dearest". He is the most handsome of the Phaeacians, and the best boxer in the games held in Odysseus's honor. He and his brothers were also the winners of the foot-racing contest. Laodamas asks Odysseus to join in the games. After Odysseus is rebuked by Euryalus, he challenges any of the Phaeacians save Laodamas. Laodamas and Halius are the best dancers among the Phaeacians.

== Notes ==
Regnal titles
Preceded by Creon	Mythical King of Thebes	Succeeded by Thersander
