= Iphidamas =

Name in Greek mythology

In Greek mythology, the name Iphidamas (Ancient Greek: Ἰφιδάμας, gen. Ἰφιδάμαντος) may refer to:

- Iphidamas, also known as Amphidamas, son of Aleus and counted as one of the Argonauts.
- Iphidamas (or Amphidamas), a son of Busiris killed by Heracles.
- Iphidamas, a son of Antenor and Theano, and the brother of Crino, Acamas, Agenor, Antheus, Archelochus, Coön, Demoleon, Eurymachus, Glaucus, Helicaon, Laodamas, Laodocus, Medon, Polybus, and Thersilochus. He was raised in Thrace by his maternal grandfather Cisseus, who sought to make him stay at home when the Trojan War broke out, by giving him his daughter in marriage for a bride price of a hundred cows and a thousand goats and sheep. Nevertheless, Iphidamas did leave for Troy the next day after the wedding. He led twelve ships, but left them at Percote and came to Troy by land. He confronted Agamemnon in battle, but his spear bent against the opponent's silver belt, whereupon Agamemnon killed Iphidamas with a sword and stripped him of his armor. Then, the Achaean king also fought and killed Iphidamas’ brother Coön, who attempted to avenge his death.
- Iphidamas, one of the Suitors of Penelope who came from Dulichium along with other 56 wooers. He, with the other suitors, was slain by Odysseus with the aid of Eumaeus, Philoetius, and Telemachus.

== See also ==
- 4791 Iphidamas, Jovian asteroid
