= Eurymachus =

Set of mythological Greek characters

The name Eurymachus or Eurymachos (/jʊˈrɪməkəs/; Ancient Greek: Εὐρύμαχος Eurúmakhos) is attributed to the following individuals:

== Mythology ==
- Eurymachus, son of Hermes and father of Eriboea, mother of the Aloadae.
- Eurymachus, a prince of the Phlegyes who attacked and destroyed Thebes after the death of Amphion and Zethus.
- Eurymachus, the fourth suitor of Princess Hippodamia of Pisa, Elis. Like the other suitors of the latter, he was killed by the bride's father, King Oenomaus.
- Eurymachus, son of Antenor and Theano. He was the brother of Crino, Acamas, Agenor, Antheus, Archelochus, Coön, Demoleon, Glaucus, Helicaon, Hippolochus, Iphidamas, Laodamas, Laodocus, Medon, Polybus, and Thersilochus. Eurymachus was engaged to King Priam's daughter Polyxena. Late in the Trojan War, following the deaths of most of the major Trojan heroes, he was inspired, alongside Aeneas, by the god Apollo to wreak havoc among the Argive lines. In a painting described by Pausanias, Eurymachus was depicted as sitting upon a rock by the house of his father, Antenor, while the rest of Troy burned, for Antenor's family had been spared by the Greeks. After the fall of Troy, he accompanied the Spartan leader Menelaus on his return voyage home, together with his own brother Glaucus. When the fleet reached Egypt, Eurymachus and Glaucus refused to continue travelling with those that had destroyed their homeland, settling down in Cyrene.
- Eurymachus, a fisherman from Syme, a small island between Caria and Rhodes, who came with their leader Nireus to fight against Troy. He was killed with a spear by Polydamas, the Trojan friend of Hector.
- Eurymachus, an Achaean warrior who participated in the Trojan War. He was among those who hid inside the Wooden Horse.
- Eurymachus, son of Polybus and one of the suitors of Penelope.

== History ==
- Eurymachus, one of the 180 Theban soldiers who were taken prisoner in the Theban siege of Plataea. All of the Theban soldiers were killed after the Plataeans brought everyone living outside of their walls into the city after unrequited negotiation with Thebes's nightly backup troops. Thucydides states that Eurymachus was "a man of great influence at Thebes," and that the Platean, Naucleides, arranged with him to bring in "a little over 300" Theban troops in the middle of the night, for a sneak attack. This event touched off the Peloponnesian War.

== Astronomy ==
9818 Eurymachos, a minor planet named after the Achaean warrior
