= Tritaea =

Tritaea or Tritaia or Triteia may refer to:

- Triteia, a figure in Greek mythology
- Tritaia, a village in Greece
- Tritaea (Achaea), a town of ancient Achaea, Greece
- Tritaea (Locris), a town of ancient Locris, Greece
- Tritaea (Phocis), a town of ancient Phocis, Greece
- Achyra (moth), a genus of Moth
- The Sailing Triteia YouTube Channel
