= Glaucus (mythology) =

Set of mythological Greek characters

In Greek mythology, Glaucus (/ˈɡlɔːkəs/; Ancient Greek: Γλαῦκος, romanized: Glaûkos, lit. 'greyish blue', 'bluish green' or 'glimmering') was the name of the following figures:

- Glaucus, a sea-god
- Glaucus, son of Sisyphus and a Corinthian king.
- Glaucus, a mythical Lycian captain in the Trojan War.
- Glaucus, son of King Minos of Crete.
- Glaucus, one of the twelve younger Panes, offspring of Pan. He came to join Dionysus in his campaign against India.
- Glaucus, son of Aretus and Laobie. He joined Deriades, along with his father and brothers, against Dionysus in the Indian War.
- Glaucus, one of the Dolionians, a people living in northwestern Asia Minor. He was killed by Jason when the Argonauts came to the country.
- Glaucus, a Trojan prince and one of the sons of King Priam by an unknown woman. He and his brothers, Antiphus, Agavus and Agathon, were all slain by Ajax the Great.
- Glaucus, son of Antenor, one of the Trojan elders, and Theano. He was the brother of Crino, Acamas, Agenor, Antheus, Archelochus, Coön, Demoleon, Eurymachus, Helicaon, Hippolochus, Iphidamas, Laodamas, Laodocus, Medon, Polybus and Thersilochus. Glaucus was rescued during the sack of Troy by the intervention of Odysseus and Menelaus, and, in a painting by Polygnotus, was depicted as sitting safely by the house of his father while the rest of the city burned. Together with his brother Eurymachus, he accompanied Menelaus on his return voyage home. However, when the fleet reached Egypt, Glaucus and Eurymachus refused to continue travelling with those that had sacked Troy, and settled down in Cyrene. Alternatively, instead of Eurymachus, it was Glaucus' brothers Acamas and Hippolochus who settled with him. In a separate account, he was disowned by his father after accompanying Paris on his expedition to kidnap Helen, and was later killed by Agamemnon during the war. Aeneas later met him in the underworld.
- Glaucus, one of the Suitors of Penelope who came from Dulichium along with other 56 wooers. He, with the other suitors, was shot dead by Odysseus with the aid of Eumaeus, Philoetius, and Telemachus.
- Glaucus, a son of Aepytus.
