= Critolaus (mythology) =

- Member of the Trojan Royal Family
- Abode: Troy

Genealogy
- Parents: Hicetaon
- Siblings: Melanippus, Thymoetes, and Antenor
- Consort: Aristomache

In Greek mythology, Critolaus (/kraɪtoʊˈleɪəs/; Ancient Greek: Κριτολάου or Κριτόλαος Kritolaos) was a member of the Trojan royal family as the son of the Trojan elder Hicetaon, son of King Laomedon of Troy. He was the brother of Melanippus, Thymoetes, and possibly, Antenor. Critolaus married Aristomache (daughter of King Priam) who became a captive after the fall of Troy.
