= Amycus (mythology) =

Set of mythological Greek characters

In Greek mythology, Amykos (Ancient Greek: Ἄμυκος), Latinized as Amycus, may refer to the following personages:

- Amycus, king of Bebrycians and son of Poseidon.
- Amycus, a centaur who fought against the Lapiths during the wedding of Pirithous and Hippodamia.
- Amycus, one of Aeneas' companions in Italy. He was killed by Turnus.
- Amycus, was married to Theano, a Trojan woman remembered for having given birth to Mimas, the same day that Paris was born.
