= Medon =

Medon may refer to:

- Medon (mythology), any of several persons with the name in Greek mythology
- Medon (beetle), a genus in the family Staphylinidae
- Médon, a town in Ivory Coast
- Medon, Tennessee, a city in Madison County
- Medon, a synonym for Leucandra, a genus of calcareous sponge
- 4836 Medon, an asteroid
- Caroline Medon (1802–1882), German opera singer
- Tion Medon, a character in Star Wars: Revenge of the Sith

== See also ==
- Meudon, a town in France
