= Theona =

Wife of Amycus

In Greek mythology, Theona or Theano (/θiˈænoʊ/; Ancient Greek: Θεανώ) was the wife of Amycus by whom she gave birth to her son, Mimas on the same night queen Hecabe's son Paris was born. Mimas was killed in exile, fighting alongside Aeneas in Italy, by Mezentius, king of the Etruscans.
