= Eurypylus (son of Euaemon) =

Greek mythological figure

In Greek mythology, Eurypylus /jʊəˈrɪpɪləs/ (Ancient Greek: Εὐρύπυλος, romanized: Eurupulos, lit. 'wide-gated') was a Thessalian king.

== Family ==
Eurypylus was the son of Euaemon and Ops. Another source gives his mother's name as either Deipyle or Deityche. Alternate genealogies made him a son of Hyperochus and father of Ormenus.

== Mythology ==
Eurypylus led the Thessalians during the Trojan War, being a former suitor of Helen. He led one of the larger contingents of ships, 40. He fought valiantly and is often listed amongst the first rank of Greek heroes such as Idomeneus, Diomedes, Ajax, etc. In the Iliad, he was one of several to accept Hector's challenge to single combat, but was eliminated in the drawing of lots. He went to the aid of Ajax the Great when the latter was wounded and tired from hard fighting and was compelled to withdraw from combat: in defending Ajax, he killed Apisaon but was wounded in the thigh and put out of action by one of Paris' arrows. This happened in the same book that all the other major Achaean warriors were wounded and put out of action. When he withdrew from battle, his wounds were tended by Patroclus, just after Nestor had convinced Patroclus either to convince Achilles to return to the fight or don his armor himself. Eurypylus slew no less than four opponents, including the aforementioned Apisaon, Hypsenor, Melanthius and Axion: this makes the account of Hyginus wrong in informing that Eurypylus killed only one defender of Troy. He was also one of the Greeks to enter the Trojan Horse.

Eurypylus survived the Trojan War; his further destiny as described by Pausanias was as follows. After the war, Eurypylus got a chest as part of his victory spoils. The chest was abandoned by Aeneas when he fled from Troy, or was intentionally left behind by Cassandra who placed a curse on it to whichever Greek would open the chest. Inside the chest was an image of Dionysus, made by Hephaestus and given to the Trojans by Zeus. When Eurypylus opened the chest, he went mad. During a period of sanity, he went to Delphi to seek a cure for his malady. The priestess told him to find a people making an unusual sacrifice and settle there. Eventually he came to Aroe (later Patrae), where he found people sacrificing a youth and a maiden to Artemis, to propitiate the goddess for the crime of Comaetho and Melanippus, who had polluted her shrine. The people of the town recognised him as a leader an oracle had said would come to them and bring about an image and cult of a foreign deity, at which point the sacrifices were to cease. After this, Eurypylus regained his sanity and the people of Patrae no longer needed to make human sacrifices. His tomb was in the city, and he was honored as a hero at the festival of Dionysus.

== Namesake ==
- 4501 Eurypylos, Jovian asteroid
