= Hicetaon =

In Greek mythology, Hicetaon (Ancient Greek: Ἱκετάων, genitive Ἱκετάονος) may refer to:

- Hicetaon, a Trojan prince as the son of King Laomedon of Troy, thus a brother of King Priam. He was one of the Trojan elders. After Paris kidnapped Helen of Troy, Hicetaon suggested that she be returned to Menelaus to avoid war. His sons were: Melanippus, who died in the war Hicetaon had sought to avert; Critolaus, husband of Priam's daughter Aristomache; Thymoetes (in the Aeneid only, otherwise given as his brother); and, possibly, Antenor.
- Hicetaon, prince of Methymna in Lesbos. He was the son of King Lepetymnus and Methymna, daughter of King Macareus. He was killed by Achilles, when the latter attacked the islands close to the mainland.
