= Aristomache (mythology) =

Trojan princess

In Greek mythology, Aristomache (Ancient Greek: Ἀριστομάχη) was a Trojan princess, the daughter of King Priam. She was married to Critolaus, son of Hicetaon. Aristomache was made captive after the sack of Troy, along with other women: Aethra, Clymene, Creusa and Xenodice.
