= Apisaon =

In Greek mythology, the name Apisaon (Ancient Greek: Ἀπισάων) refers to two defenders of Troy during the Trojan War:

- Apisaon, son of Phausius, who confronted Ajax the Great but was killed by Eurypylus.
- Apisaon of Paeonia, son of Hippasus, killed by Lycomedes.
