= Tritaea (Phocis) =

Tritaea or Tritaia (Ancient Greek: Τριταία), also Tritea, was a town of ancient Phocis. During the Greco-Persian Wars, the army of Xerxes I burned the town in 480 BC. Strabo distinguishes it from the Achaean town of the same name.

Its location is unknown.
