= Aesyetes =

In Greek mythology, Aesyetes (/ɛˈsaɪɛtiːz/, eh-SY-eh-teez; Ancient Greek: Αἰσυήτης, romanized: Aisyḗtēs, lit. 'the ruler', 'the prince' or 'the chief') was a Trojan hero and father of Alcathous. He was also given as the father of Assaracus and Antenor by Cleomestra. Aesyetes' tomb was the vantage point which Polites, son of Priam, used to scout the Greek camp during the Trojan War.
