= Agesarchus of Tritaea =

Ancient Greek athlete

Agesarchus (Greek: Αγήσαρχος) was an ancient Greek athlete from Tritaea in Achaea. He was the son of Haemostratus, and won in the men's boxing competitions at all the Panhellenic Games. His victories have been dated around the 165th Olympiad in 120 BC. A statue in his honor was erected at Olympia, the work of the sons of Polycles.
