= Tritaea (Achaea) =

Polis (city-state) of Achaea

Coordinates: 37°57′32″N 21°41′13″E

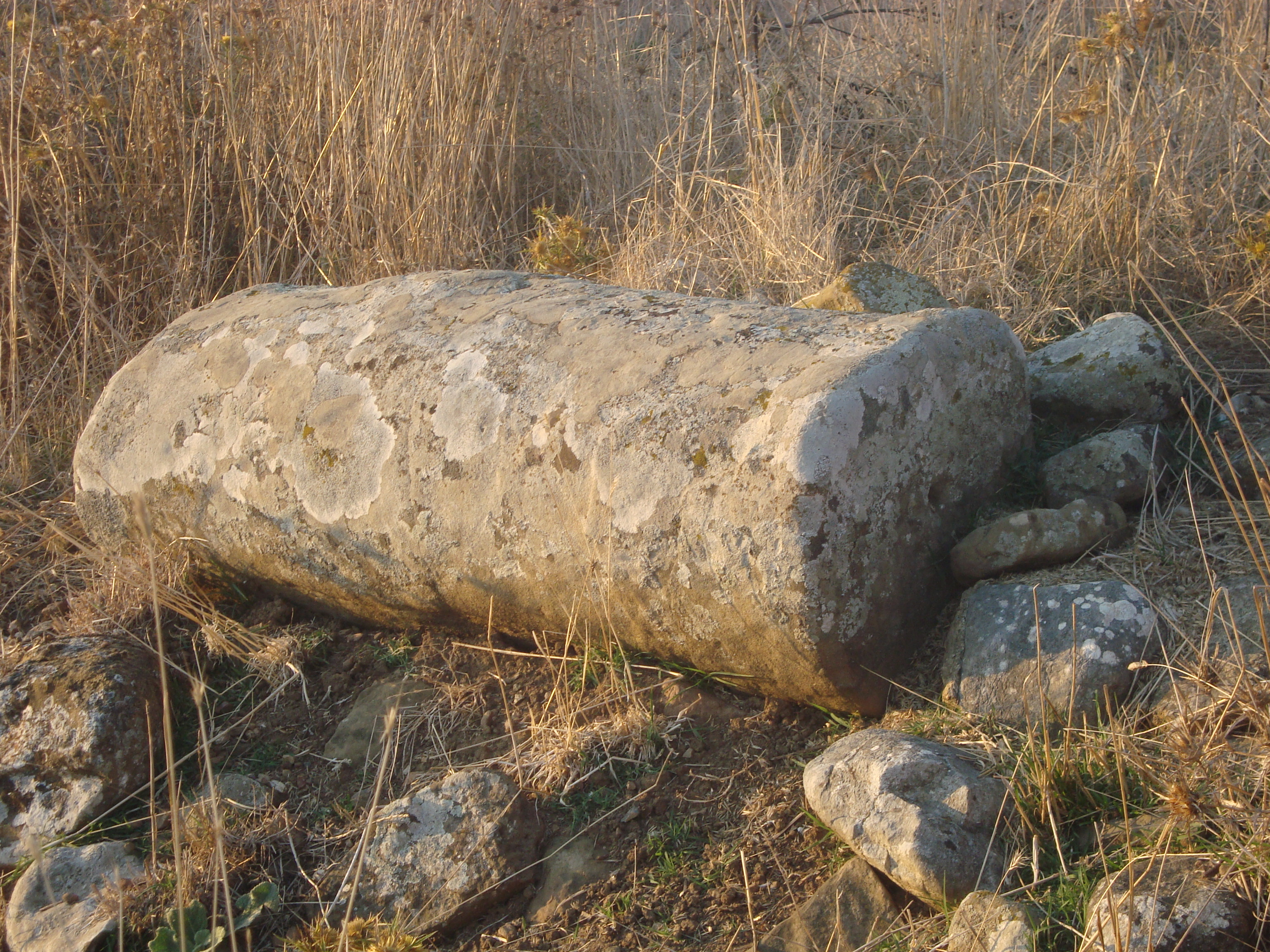
Ruins of the ancient town

Tritaea or Tritaia (Ancient Greek: Τριταία) was a polis (city-state) of Achaea, and the most inland of the 12 Achaean cities, was distant 120 stadia from Pharae. According Pausanias, Tritaea's foundation was said to be due to either: Celbidas, who came from Cumae; or Melanippus, a son of Ares and Triteia, herself a daughter of Triton and priestess of Athena, and that Melanippus named the town after his mother.

It was one of the four cities that took the lead in reviving the Achaean League during the 124th Olympiad (c. 280 BCE). In the Social War it suffered from the attacks of the Aetolians and Eleians. Its territory was annexed to Patrae by Augustus, when he made the latter city a colony after the Battle of Actium. Tritaea was home to Agesarchus of Tritaea, an Olympic victor around 120 BCE, whose statue graced Olympia.

Map of ancient Achaea (with place names in Greek)

Highlights of Pausanias's visit in the 2nd century included a white marble tomb with paintings by Nicias in the vicinity of the city. Also in the city there was a sanctuary of the gods, with images of clay and in honour of which an annual feast was celebrated, and also a temple of Athena with a stone image that had replaced another that the Romans had taken to Rome. There sacrifices were celebrated to Ares and to Triteia. In Triteia there was a sanctuary of the gods called Almighty (Μεγίστων θεῶν), and their statues in the sanctuary were made of clay. In honor of these gods every year a festival was held.

The site of Tritaea is located at modern Agia Marina.
