= Comaetho (priestess) =

Priestess in Greek legend

In ancient Greek mythology and folklore, Comaetho (Ancient Greek: Κομαιθώ, romanized: Komaithṓ, lit. 'bright-haired') is a legendary heroine who served Artemis Triclaria in Patrae as virgin priestess. Comaetho fell in love with Melanippus, and unable to marry him, she consorted with him in secret inside the temple, earning the goddess' wrath. Artemis then sent famine and plague to the city. Her tale is preserved in the Description of Greece, a travel guide by second-century traveller Pausanias.

== Legend ==
Near Patrae, Artemis Triclaria ("she of the three allotments") was worshipped, with a festival and vigils celebrated each year in her honour. The priesthood of the goddess was held by a virgin until it was time for her to be given to her new husband.

Local legend had it that Comaetho was the most beautiful maiden in town, and was chosen to serve as priestess to Artemis Triclaria. She fell in love with Melanippus, who was the most capable and handsome among his peers, but when the pair expressed their desire to marry, both their parents opposed the marriage and refused to let them wed with harsh words when Melanippus asked for Comaetho's hand in marriage. So instead Comaetho and Melanippus became lovers in secret, and would often meet and have sex inside the goddess' temple as if it were a bridechamber. The goddess was enraged at the grave sacrilege they committed, so she cursed Patrae with crop failure, famine and peculiar but lethal diseases that crippled the Patreans.

Eventually the people sought the guidance of the Oracle of Delphi, and the Pythia informed them that the goddess would only be appeased if they sacrificed Comaetho and Melanippus to her. Furthermore they were to sacrifice to her each year the most beautiful maiden and the most handsome young man. Because of all those deaths, the local river was named Ameilichus ("merciless"), when before it had no name. Many youths perished to their sorrow and the sorrow of their kin, but in the words of Pausanias, Comaetho and Melanippus were out of sorrow's reach, for there was nothing greater in life than to have loved and have been loved in return.

The cycle of sacrifice would end when, according to a Delphic prophecy, a king would come with a foreign deity. This was fulfilled when Eurypylus arrived in Patrae and introduced the worship of a new god, Dionysus, whose image he brought from Troy after its fall, ending both the sacrifices and also curing himself of madness which had plagued him ever since he had first looked at the god's image when he opened the chest it was kept in.

== Culture ==
The story of the two lovers is one of the many temple-legends scattered around the Peloponnese peninsula.

== See also ==
Other women associated with defiling a goddess' temple:

- Medusa
- Cassandra
- Auge

== Bibliography ==
- Avery, Catherine B., ed. (1962). New Century Classical Handbook. New York, US: Appleton-Century-Crofts.
- Bell, Robert E. (1991). Women of Classical Mythology: A Biographical Dictionary. ABC-Clio. ISBN 9780874365818.
- Fowler, Robert L. (2000). Early Greek Mythography. Vol. 2: Commentary. Oxford, UK: Oxford University Press. ISBN 978-0-19-814741-1.
- Graves, Robert (1955). The Greek Myths. Vol. I (3rd 1960 ed.). London: Penguin. ISBN 978-0140010268.
- Grimal, Pierre (1987). The Dictionary of Classical Mythology. Wiley-Blackwell. ISBN 0-631-13209-0.
- Hard, Robin (2004). The Routledge Handbook of Greek Mythology: Based on H.J. Rose's "Handbook of Greek Mythology". Routledge. ISBN 9780415186360.
- March, Jennifer R. (May 31, 2014). Dictionary of Classical Mythology. Oxbow Books. ISBN 978-1-78297-635-6.
- Pausanias, Description of Greece with an English Translation by W.H.S. Jones, Litt.D., and H.A. Ormerod, M.A., in 4 Volumes. Cambridge, MA, Harvard University Press; London, William Heinemann Ltd. 1918. Online version at the Perseus Digital Library.
- Prescendi, Francesca (October 1, 2006). "Comaetho". In Cancik, Hubert; Schneider, Helmuth (eds.). Brill's New Pauly Online. Translated by Christine F. Salazar. Geneva: Brill Reference Online. doi:10.1163/1574-9347_bnp_e618780. ISSN 1574-9347.
- Rose, Herbert J. (1959). A Handbook of Greek Mythology. London, New York: E. P. Dutton & Co., Inc.
- Tripp, Edward (June 1970). Crowell's Handbook of Classical Mythology (1st ed.). Thomas Y. Crowell Co. ISBN 069022608X.
