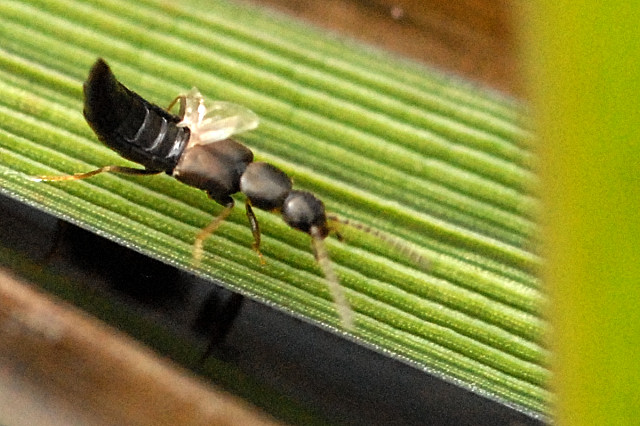

Scientific classification
- Kingdom: Animalia
- Phylum: Arthropoda
- Clade: Pancrustacea
- Class: Insecta
- Order: Coleoptera
- Suborder: Polyphaga
- Infraorder: Staphyliniformia
- Family: Staphylinidae
- Tribe: Lathrobiini
- Subtribe: Medonina
- Genus: Medon (Platymedon) truncatum Hatch, 1957

= Medon (beetle) =

Genus of beetles

Medon is a genus of rove beetles in the family Staphylinidae. There are at least 60 described species in Medon.

== Species ==
These 67 species belong to the genus Medon:

- Medon adamsoni Cameron, 1933^{g}
- Medon americanus Casey, 1905^{g}
- Medon apicalis (Kraatz, 1857)^{g}
- Medon augur Fauvel, 1906^{g}
- Medon beroni Coiffait, 1970^{g}
- Medon brunneus (Erichson, 1839)^{g}
- Medon bulgaricus Coiffait, 1970^{g}
- Medon castaneus (Gravenhorst, 1802)^{g}
- Medon cauchoisi Jarrige, 1949^{g}
- Medon celebensis Sharp, 1908^{i c g}
- Medon cerrutii Coiffait, 1976^{g}
- Medon choparti Coiffait, 1987^{g}
- Medon confertus Sharp^{g}
- Medon convergens (Casey, 1886)^{g}
- Medon croaticus Toth, 1980^{g}
- Medon ctenophorum Hatch, 1957^{g}
- Medon despectus (Fairmaire, 1860)^{g}
- Medon dilutus (Erichson, 1839)^{g}
- Medon dobrogicus Decu & Georgescu, 1995^{g}
- Medon erevanensis Coiffait, 1970^{g}
- Medon feloi Assing, 1998^{g}
- Medon ferrugineus (Erichson, 1840)^{g}
- Medon fuscipennis Kraatz, 1859^{i c g}
- Medon fusculus (Mannerheim, 1830)^{g}
- Medon gomyi Lecoq, 1987^{g}
- Medon guignoti Coiffait, 1987^{g}
- Medon guppyi (Hatch, 1957)^{g}
- Medon haafi Scheerpeltz, 1956^{g}
- Medon hatchi Herman, 2003^{g}
- Medon indigena (Wollaston, 1857)^{g}
- Medon insulanus^{b}
- Medon insularis Casey, 1905^{g}
- Medon laticollis (Casey, 1889)^{g}
- Medon lecoqi Janák, 2014^{g}
- Medon lewisius Sharp^{g}
- Medon macedonicus Coiffait, 1976^{g}
- Medon marinus Cameron, 1944^{g}
- Medon mcleodi Hatch, 1957^{g}
- Medon olympicus Scheerpeltz, 1963^{g}
- Medon pacifica Cameron, 1933^{g}
- Medon papeetensis Coiffait, 1980^{g}
- Medon paradobrogicus Decu & Georgescu, 1995^{g}
- Medon perniger Coiffait, 1978^{g}
- Medon petrochilosi Coiffait, 1970^{g}
- Medon piceus (Kraatz, 1858)^{g}
- Medon planus (Kraatz, 1859)^{g}
- Medon pocofer (Peyron, 1858)^{g}
- Medon pocoferus (Peyron, 1857)^{g}
- Medon prolixus (Sharp, 1874)^{g}
- Medon pugetensis Hatch, 1957^{g}
- Medon pythonissa (Saulcy, 1864)^{g}
- Medon quadratus Hatch, 1957^{g}
- Medon rhodiensis Scheerpeltz, 1963^{g}
- Medon ripicola (Kraatz, 1854)^{g}
- Medon rubeculus Sharp, 1889^{g}
- Medon rufipenne^{b}
- Medon rufiventris (Nordmann, 1837)^{g}
- Medon sardous Dodero, 1922^{g}
- Medon shastanicus (Casey, 1905)^{g}
- Medon subcoriaceus (Wollaston, 1864)^{g}
- Medon submaculatus Sharp^{g}
- Medon subterraneus Coiffait, 1970^{g}
- Medon tahitiensis Coiffait, 1976^{g}
- Medon truncatus Hatch, 1957^{g}
- Medon vancouveri (Casey, 1905)^{g}
- Medon vicentensis Serrano, 1993^{g}
- Medon vitalei Bernhauer, 1936^{g}

Data sources: i = ITIS, c = Catalogue of Life, g = GBIF, b = Bugguide.net
