= Mimas (Aeneid) =

Mimas (Ancient Greek: Μίμας) was a Greek mythological character who appears in Virgil's Aeneid. A noble Trojan, he was the son of Amycus and Theano. Mimas was said to be a friend of Paris and was born on the same day as him. He accompanied Aeneas to Italy, where he was killed by Mezentius.
