= Hypsenor =

List of eponymous characters in Greek mythology

In Greek mythology, the name Hypsenor (Ancient Greek: Ὑψήνωρ) may refer to:

- Hypsenor, a Trojan priest, son of Dolopion, killed by Eurypylus.
- Hypsenor, son of Hippasus, fought under Antilochus and was killed by Deiphobus.
- Hypsenor, a son of Neleus and Chloris.
