= Hippolochus =

Hippolochus may refer to:

- Hippolochus (writer), Macedonian writer, student of Theophrastus
- Hippolochus (mythology), figure from Greek mythology
