= Triteia =

Daughter of Triton in Greek mythology

Triteia (Ancient Greek: Τρίτεια, romanized: Tríteia) was, in Greek mythology, the daughter of the sea god Triton and the mother, by Ares, of Melanippus. Her son gave to a town in Achaea her name. Sacrifices were offered there to Ares and Tritaea in the temple of Athena.
