= Melanippus =

Figures in Greek mythology

The name Melanippus is the masculine counterpart of Melanippe.

In Greek mythology, there were several people named Melanippus (Ancient Greek: Μελάνιππος, romanized: Melánippos, lit. 'black horse'):

- Melanippus, one of the sons of Agrius and possibly Dia, daughter of King Porthaon of Calydon. Along with his brothers, except Thersites, he was killed by Diomedes.
- Melanippus or Menalippus, brother of Tydeus and thus possible son of Oeneus, king of Calydon and Periboea. He was accidentally slain by Tydeus during a hunt. In some accounts, the murdered brother of Tydeus was called Olenias.
- Melanippus, son of Perigune and Theseus, the father of Ioxus who, together with Ornytus, led a colony to Caria and became the ancestor of the family Ioxides.
- Melanippus, sometimes misspelled "Menalippus", son of Astacus (hence referred to by the patronymic Astacides in Ovid), defender of Thebes in Aeschylus' play Seven Against Thebes. In the play, he defended the Proitid gate against Tydeus. He killed two of the seven attacking champions, Mecisteus and Tydeus, but was killed by either Amphiaraus, or by Tydeus himself as he died. (In versions where Melanippus is killed by someone other than Tydeus, the slayer decapitates him and delivers his head to Tydeus). Tydeus broke Melanippus' skull open and consumed his brain, which disgusted Athena so that she gave up her intent of making Tydeus immortal. Herodotus relates how in historical times, Cleisthenes abolished the hero cult of Adrastus in Sicyon in favour of that of Melanippus.
- Melanippus, son of Hicetaon and a native of Percote. He was the brother of Thymoetes, Critolaus and possibly Antenor. Melanippus fought under Hector, wishing to avenge the death of his cousin Dolops, and was killed by Antilochus during the Trojan War.
- Melanippus, one of the 50 sons of Priam. His mother was a woman other than Hecuba. He fought in the Trojan War and was shot dead by Teucer. In some accounts, Melanippus was described to have a plume of horsehair like his brother Idaeus.
- Melanippus, yet another Trojan, who was killed by Patroclus.
- Melanippus, one of the Achaeans who fought at Troy. He was one of those who helped Odysseus carry the gifts at the point of reconciliation between Achilles and Agamemnon.
- Melanippus, son of Ares and Triteia, daughter of the sea-god Triton, founder of the city of Tritaia, which he named after his own mother.
- Melanippus, a young man of Patrae who was in love with Comaetho, but the parents on both sides were against their marriage. Melanippus and Comaetho met secretly in the temple of Artemis, where the girl served as priestess, and had sex there. The outraged goddess cursed the country with plague and famine; in order to put an end to the calamity, the inhabitants of Patrae were instructed by the oracle of Delphi to sacrifice both lovers to the goddess and, from then on, to sacrifice the handsomest young man and the most beautiful girl of the city each year, until a new strange deity is introduced in Patrae. The practice lasted until Eurypylus, son of Euaemon, on his way back from Troy, brought an image of Dionysus to Patrae.
- Melanippus, son of Helorus, leader of the Mysian contingent in the Trojan War, killed by Neoptolemus.
- Menalippus (misspelling of "Melanippus"? cf. #3 above), a son of Acastus. He, alongside his brother Pleisthenes and their servant Cinyras, was killed by Neoptolemus as they were hunting near the latter's grandfather Peleus' hideout, since Acastus and his family had been hostile towards Peleus.

In ancient Sicily, Melanippus was a hero of Agrigento alongside his lover Chariton. They plotted against the cruel tyrant Phalaris, but were denounced and tortured. However, their mutual love and their refusal to betray their friends as accomplices moved the tyrant, who dismissed them with great praise.
