= Dardanians (Trojan) =

People in Greek mythology

Pinax depicting a Dardanian horseman, 4th to 2nd century BC

The Dardanoi (Greek: Δάρδανοι), also known as Dardanians or Dardans, were a legendary people of the Troad, located in northwestern Anatolia. The Dardanoi were the descendants of Dardanus, the mythical founder of Dardanus, an ancient city in the Troad. A contingent of Dardanians figures among Troy's allies in the Trojan War.

Nothing is known of the Dardanoi, except that a contingent of them figures among Troy's allies in the Trojan War. Homer makes a distinction between the Trojans and the Dardanoi, however the latter are now considered to have been a branch of the former.

== Dardanoi and Trojans ==
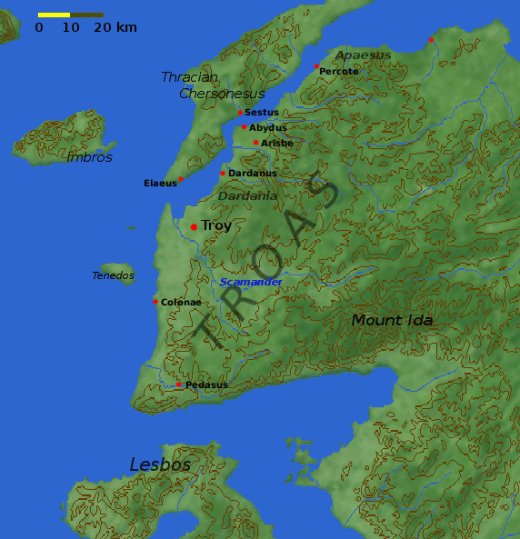
Troas

The Royal House of Troy was also divided into two branches, that of the Dardanoi and that of the Trojans (their city being called Troy, or sometimes Ilion/Ilium). The House of the Dardanoi (its members being the Dardanids, Greek: Δαρδανίδαι; Latin: Dardanidae) was older than the House of Troy, but Troy later became more powerful. Aeneas is referred to in Virgil's Aeneid interchangeably as a Dardanian or as a Trojan, but strictly speaking, Aeneas was of the branch of the Dardanoi. Many rulers of Rome, for example Julius Caesar and Augustus, claimed descent from Aeneas and the Houses of Troy and Dardania. Homer adds the epithet Dardanides (Δαρδανίδης) to Priam and to other prominent characters denoting that they are members of the house of the Dardanoi.

Homer writes;

The Dardanians were led by brave Aeneas, whom the fair Aphrodite, a goddess bedded with a mortal man, bore to Anchises in the mountains of Ida. He was not alone, for with him were the two sons of Antenor, Archilochus and Acamas, both skilled in all the arts of war.

The strait of the Dardanelles was named after the Dardanoi, who lived in the region.

== Origins ==
=== Ancient authors ===
In ancient times, authors generally saw the Dardanians as descendants of Dardanus.

According to Homer, Dardanus is a son of Zeus. Hesiod and, later, Pseudo-Apollodorus expand on this, stating that Dardanus, alongside Iasion, are sons of Zeus and Electra. Diodorus Siculus agrees with this story, also asserting that Dardanus was born in Samothrace. Lycophron alleged that Dardanus escaped from Samothrace to the Troad during the flood in Deucalion's time.

Dionysius of Halicarnassus and Marcus Terentius Varro stated that Dardanus was a king of Arcadia, Peloponnese, Greece and that his descendants, the Dardanians, were therefore Greeks. Virgil, on the other hand, set forth a different view, which he may have invented himself, that Dardanus came from Italy instead. Maurus Servius Honoratus reports all of these traditions and also notes that "others say he was Cretan; others that he was born around Troy and Ida".

=== Modern authors ===
In the modern era, the ethnic affinities of the Dardanoi and the nature of their language remain a mystery. Possible Phrygian and/or Mycenaean connections have been proposed.

Archaeological finds from the Troad dating back to the Chalcolithic period show striking affinity to archaeological finds known from the same era in Muntenia and Moldavia, and there are other traces which suggest close ties between the Troad and the Carpatho-Balkan region of Europe. Archaeologists in fact have stated that the styles of certain ceramic objects and bone figurines show that these objects were brought into the Troad by Carpatho-Danubian colonists; for example, certain ceramic objects have been shown to have Cucuteni origins. Egyptian records from the Battle of Qadesh refer to Hittite allies known as Drdny, likely referring to the Dardanoi.

According to Walter Leaf (1915):

The Dardanians who founded the Troy of the Mycenaean age were—and this is hardly questioned now—a branch of the Phrygian stock, who were themselves sharers in the great thrust of the nations from the north. The Phrygian language was closely akin to the Greek [see: Graeco-Phrygian], and the two nations had doubtless come down together, or nearly at the same time, from the Danube valley.

Meanwhile, according to Manousos Kambouris (2023):

Aeneas was of divine lineage; son of Aphrodite/Istar to Anchises of Dardania (II-819/22), a dynastic partner in Assuwa and with a voice in public affairs (XIII-463), who does not participate in the Trojan senate, though. Two Dardanians do, the only Senators not of the bloodline of Priam (III-146/50). Two of the most prestigious families of Troy are actually Dardanians; Euphorbus, the son of Senator Panthus is explicitly called a Dardanian (XVI-807/8), and two of the sons of Senator Antenor (II-822/3) are commanding the Dardanian contingent with Aeneas (II-819/20). Thus the Dardanians are Trojans, the Trojans are not all of them Dardanians. There is some debate that the same goes for the Lycians.

== Variations of the name ==
Homer in the Iliad carefully distinguishes the Dardanoi from the Trojans, not only in the list of Trojan allies (11:816–823) but also in the frequently repeated formula keklyte meu, Trôes kai Dardanoi ed' epikuroi (e.g., 3.456)".

Words used by Homer are:

- Dardaniōnes, Δαρδανίωνες, denotes people of the Troad in general.
- Dardanioi, Δαρδάνιοι, same as above.
- Dardanides, Δαρδανίδης, a name given to Aenias, as a descendant of Dardanus; in Latin, the plural form (Latin: Dardanidae; Greek: Δαρδανίδαι) is sometimes also used for Trojan women in the Aeneid.
- Dardanoi, Δάρδανοι, descendants of Dardanus, but sometimes distinguished as descendants of Assarakos whose branch of the family, including Aineias, continued to count Dardanie (a non-urban settlement up in the foothills of Mt. Ida) as home rather than Ilios, the citadel by the sea (see 20.215ff. and 2.819-20n).

== See also ==
- Iliad
