= Theano =

Figures in Greek mythology

In Greek mythology, Theano (/θiˈeɪnoʊ/; Ancient Greek: Θεανώ, romanized: Theanṓ, lit. 'goddess', 'divine', or 'divine one') may refer to the following personages:

- Theano, wife of Metapontus, king of Icaria. Metapontus demanded that she bear him children, or leave the kingdom. She presented the children of Melanippe to her husband, as if they were her own. Later Theano bore him two sons of her own and, wishing to leave the kingdom to her own children, sent them to kill Melanippe's. In the fight that ensued, her two sons were killed, and she committed suicide upon hearing the news.
- Theano, one of the Danaïdes, daughter of Danaus and Polyxo. She married (and murdered) Phantes, son of Aegyptus and Caliadne.
- Theano, a priestess of Athena in Troy during the Trojan War. She was a daughter of King Cisseus of Thrace and wife of Antenor, one of the Trojan elders.
- Theano or Theona, a character appearing in the Aeneid, the consort of Amycus.
