= Theano (wife of Antenor) =

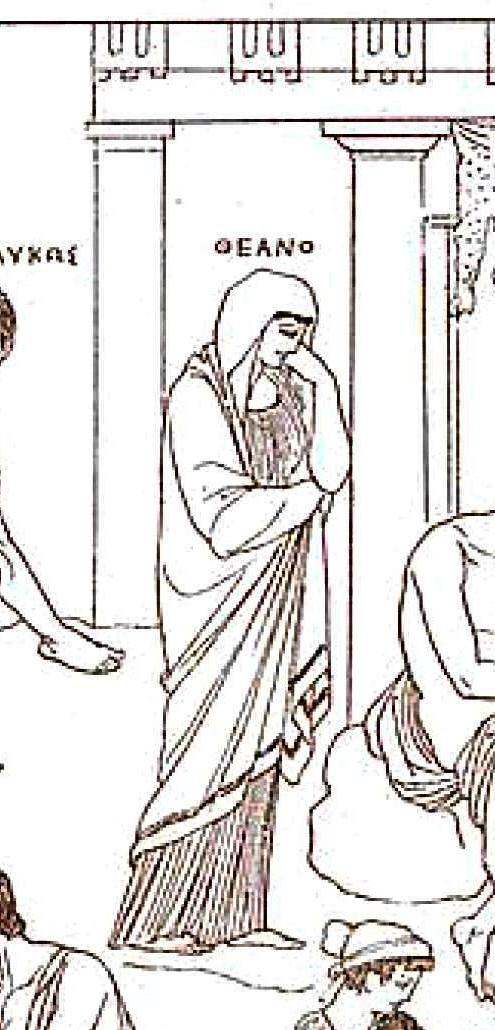
Theano seen in a painting by Polygnotus depicting the fall of Troy

In Greek mythology, Theano (/θiˈænoʊ/; Ancient Greek: Θεανώ) was the wife of Antenor and a priestess of Athena at Troy during the Trojan War.

== Family ==
Theano was a daughter of King Cisseus and Queen Telecleia of Thrace, and thus the sister of Queen Hecuba, wife of King Priam of Troy. She was the wife of Antenor and the mother of Acamas, Archelocus, Eurymachus, Glaucus and Iphidamas.

== Mythology ==
The household of Antenor and Theano advocated for peace and advised Helen's return to the Greeks. Because of their support— which some claimed was treason— the Greeks spared their household when they sacked the city. In Book VI of the Iliad, alongside Hecuba and other Trojan women, Theano offered a gift and plea to Athena for the survival of the city, but was rebuffed.

After the sack of Troy, one story has Theano and Antenor sailing with Aeneas to Italy and founding the city of Padua. Another story has her taking the Palladium, an image of Athena that had fallen from the sky and supposedly provided Troy its protection, with her.
