= Antenor (mythology) =

Name of two figures in Greek mythology

In Greek mythology, Antenor (Ancient Greek: Ἀντήνωρ, romanized: Antḗnōr, lit. 'against man' or 'instead of a man') may refer to two distinct characters:

- Antenor, husband of Theano of Troy and an advisor to king Priam of Troy who betrayed Troy to the Greek invaders.
- Antenor, one of the Suitors of Penelope who came from Zacynthus along with 43 other wooers. He, with the other suitors, was killed by Odysseus with the aid of Eumaeus, Philoetius, and Telemachus.
