= Acamas (son of Antenor) =

In Greek mythology, the son of Trojan elder Antenor and Theano

In Greek mythology, Acamas or Akamas (/ɑːˈkɑːmɑːs/; Ancient Greek: Ἀκάμας), was the son of Trojan elder Antenor and Theano. He participated in the Trojan War, and fought on the side of the Trojans. It comes from the negative prefix a- combined with kamno, a verb meaning "to grow weary" or "to toil".

== Mythology ==
=== Trojan War ===
With his brother Archelochus and his cousin Aeneas, Acamas was lieutenant of the Dardanian contingent to assist King Priam. According to one scholiast, Priam chose the sons of Antenor to command because he did not fully trust Aeneas. Along with Aeneas and Archelochus he led one of the five divisions attacking the Argive wall in the battle for the ships. Homer's Iliad, Book 2, describes the troops of the Dardanians and its leaders:

"The Dardanians were led by brave Aeneas, whom Aphrodite bore to Anchises, when she, goddess though she was, had lain with him upon the mountain slopes of Ida. He was not alone, for with him were the two sons of Antenor, Arkhilokhos and Akamas, both skilled in all the arts of war."

While in Book 14, Acamas avenged the death of his brother, who had been killed by Ajax, by slaying Promachus the Boeotian.

"But he knew well who it was, and the Trojans were greatly vexed with grief [akhos]. Akamas then bestrode his brother's body and wounded Promakhos the Boeotian with his spear, for he was trying to drag his brother's body away. Akamas vaunted loudly over him saying, "Argive archers, braggarts that you are, toil [ponos] and suffering shall not be for us only, but some of you too shall fall here as well as ourselves. See how Promakhos now sleeps, vanquished by my spear; payment for my brother's blood has not long delayed; a man, therefore, may well be thankful if he leaves a kinsman in his house behind him to avenge his fall."

=== Death ===
Two sources tackles the versions of the myth regarding Acamas' death. He was killed possibly by Meriones of Crete, half-brother of King Idomeneus in book 16 of the Iliad, but the Acamas killed there was not specifically identified as a son of Antenor. Quintus of Smyrna describes him as having been killed by the Greek hero Philoctetes.

==== Homer's account ====
"Meriones gave chase to Akamas on foot and caught him up just as he was about to mount his chariot; he drove a spear through his right shoulder so that he fell headlong from the car, and his eyes were closed in darkness."

==== Quintus' account ====
Now Poeas' son [i.e. Philoctetes] the while slew Deioneus and Acamas, Antenor's warrior son: Yea, a great host of strong men laid he low..'

=== Survival ===
In at least one account, Acamas survived the war, and, together with his brothers Glaucus and Hippolochus, accompanied Menelaus on his return voyage home. When the fleet reached Egypt, Acamas and his brothers no longer wished to travel alongside those who had sacked Troy, and settled in Cyrene.
