= Laodocus =

Mythological characters

In Greek mythology, the name Laodocus (/leɪˈɒdəkəs/; Ancient Greek: Λαόδοκος or Λαοδόκος, lit. 'receiving the people') or Leodocus (Λεωδόκος) may refer to:

- Laodocus, the Aetolian son of Apollo and Phthia, brother of Dorus and Polypoetes; all three were killed by Aetolus, son of Endymion.
- Laodocus or Leodocus, one of the Argonauts, son of Bias and Pero, brother of Talaus and Areius.
- Laodocus, a warrior in the army of the Seven against Thebes, who won the javelin-throwing match at the funeral games of Opheltes.
- Laodocus or Ladocus, a prince of Tegea as son of King Echemus of Arcadia and Timandra, daughter of Tyndareus and Leda. The suburb Ladoceia in Arcadia was named after him.
- Laodocus, a Trojan prince and an illegitimate son of King Priam of Troy.
- Laodocus, a Trojan son of Antenor and possibly of Theano. Athena assumed his shape to persuade Pandarus to break the truce between the Greeks and the Trojans. According to one scholiast on the Iliad, Laodocus had a history of violating the law, which is why his argument is especially convincing to Pandarus. He is possibly the same as the Laodocus killed by Diomedes.
