= Crino =

In Greek mythology, the name Crino (/ˈkraɪnoʊ/; Ancient Greek: Κρινώ, romanized: Krinō) may refer to:

- Crino, one of the many consorts of King Danaus of Libya, mother of the Danaïdes Callidice, Oeme, Celaeno and Hyperippe. These daughters wed and slayed their cousin-husbands, sons of King Aegyptus of Egypt and Hephaestine during their wedding night. According to Hippostratus, Danaus had all of his progeny by a single woman, Europe, daughter of the river-god Nilus. In some accounts, he married his cousin Melia, daughter of Agenor, king of Tyre.
- Crino, daughter of Antenor and Theano. Pausanias mentions a painting of her by Polygnotus, where she is portrayed standing next to her father, with a baby in her arms.
