= Antheus =

Set of Greek mythological characters

In Greek mythology, Antheus (Ancient Greek: Ἀνθεύς derived from ἀνθέω antheō "to blossom, to bloom") may refer to:

- Antheus of Lyctus, son of Agelaus and a soldier in the army of Dionysus, killed by Deriades.
- Antheus, a royal youth of Halicarnassus who was sent to the court of King Phobius and Queen Cleoboea (or Philaechme) of Miletus. Cleoboea fell in love with him, but he rejected her out of respect for his host and the rules of hospitality. Cleoboea was angered, but feigned courtesy and pretended to get over him. One day she chased a timid partridge or threw her golden cup down a well, and asked Antheus to fetch it back. After Antheus had descended, she dropped a heavy boulder on him, killing him instantly. In regret she took her own life as well.
- Antheus, the Thessalian son of Nomion and father of Aegypius by Bulis.
- Antheus, a warrior killed in the war of the Seven against Thebes.
- Antheus, a young son of Antenor loved by the Trojan princes Paris and Deiphobus. He was accidentally killed by the former. This has led the pair to be associated with the story of Apollo and Hyacinthus.
- Antheus, a companion of Aeneas reunited with him in Carthage after being separated during the storm, and later a participant in the war against Turnus.
- Antheus, surname of Dionysus in Anthea, Achaea.

== Legacy ==
- Antheus, English Name for The Antonov An-22.
