= List of Homeric scenes with proper names =

List of scenes in Homer which have specific names

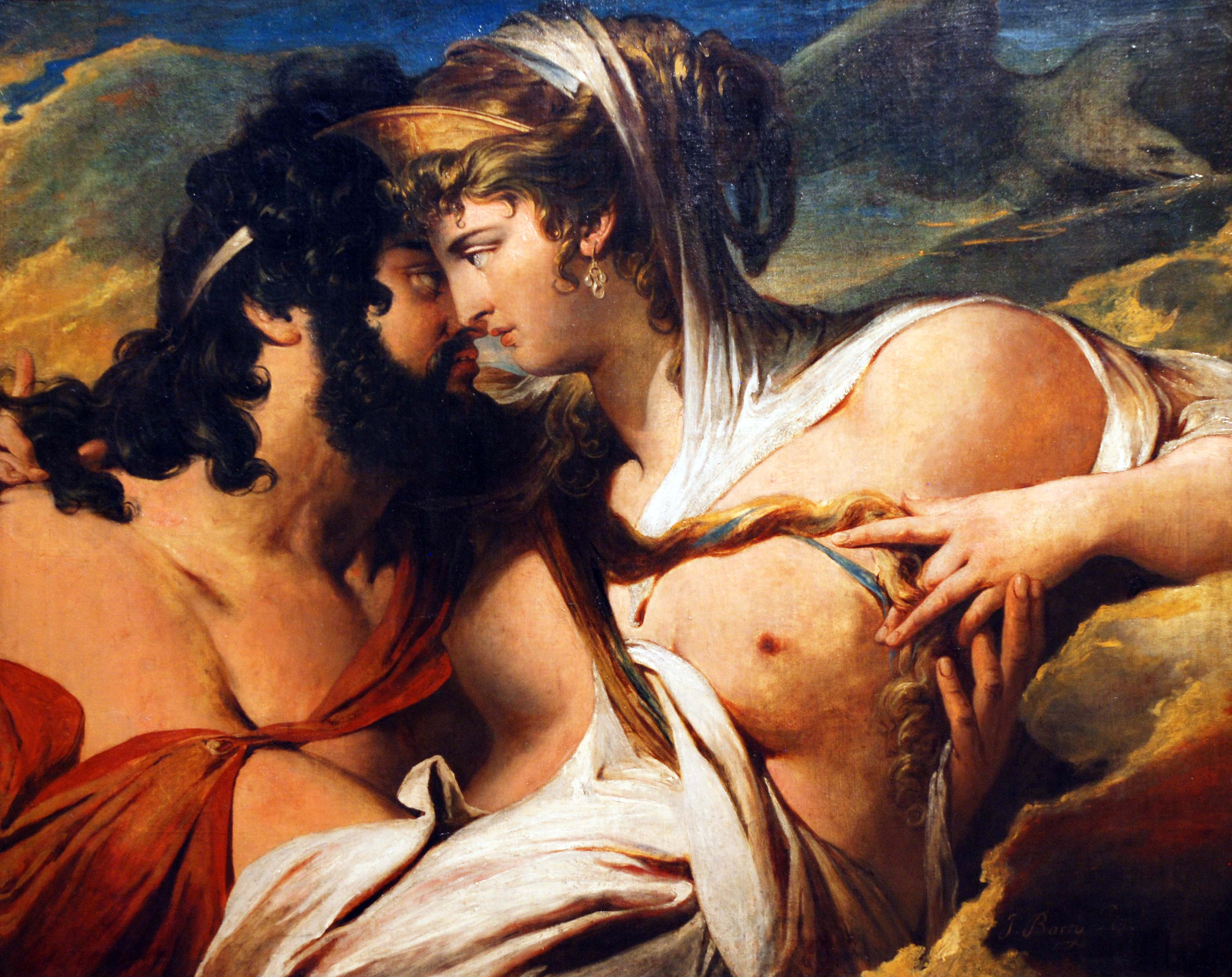
Dios Apate depicted by James Barry, 1773 (City Art Galleries, Sheffield.)

A list of proper names of scenes or sections in Homer's Iliad and Odyssey.

This is not a list of scenes of any particular type. This is a list of names of scenes or sections.

In several cases, these names have taken on a more generic meaning: They are sometimes used as literary terms to describe a generic type of scene, or a type of narrative event, in many different works beyond Homer.

The painting on the right, titled Jupiter and Juno on Mount Ida, depicts the scene known as "Dios Apate" or "The Deception of Zeus" from Book 14 of the Iliad. (James Barry, 1773, City Art Galleries, Sheffield.)

== Scenes in Homer's Iliad and Odyssey with proper names ==
Name	Text	Greek Name	Alternate Names	Scene Description	Origin of Name
Nekyia	Odyssey; Book 11	Νέκυια	Summoning of the Dead	Odysseus journeys to the underworld, consulting the prophet Tiresias and conversing with shades like Agamemnon, Achilles, and his mother Anticleia.	From νέκυς (corpse) or νεκρός (dead)
Teichoscopy	Iliad; Book 3	Τειχοσκοπία	Viewing from the Wall, Teichoscopia	Priam and other Trojan elders stand on the city walls, observing the Greek army. Helen identifies key Greek heroes (e.g., Agamemnon, Odysseus) for Priam.	From τεῖχος (wall) and σκοπέω (to view)
Doloneia	Iliad; Book 10	Δολώνεια	The Affair of Dolon	A night raid where Odysseus and Diomedes capture and kill the Trojan spy Dolon, who reveals Trojan plans. The Greeks then slaughter Thracian allies led by Rhesus.	Named after Dolon (Δόλων), the main Trojan character in the scene
Aristeia of Diomedes	Iliad; Book 5	Διομήδους Ἀριστεία	The Excellence of Diomedes	Diomedes, inspired by Athena, dominates the battlefield, wounding the gods Aphrodite and Ares, and killing numerous Trojans in a heroic rampage.	aristeia (ἀριστεία) refers to a hero’s moment of supreme valor, a common Homeric motif
Aristeia of Agamemnon	Iliad; Book 11	Ἀγαμέμνονος Ἀριστεία	The Excellence of Agamemnon	Agamemnon leads a ferocious assault on the Trojans, slaying many before being wounded. The episode highlights his leadership and martial skill.	aristeia (ἀριστεία) refers to a hero’s moment of supreme valor, a common Homeric motif
Aristeia of Hector	Iliad; Books 11-12, 15-16	Ἕκτορος Ἀριστεία	The Excellence of Hector	Hector leads the Trojan counterattack, breaching the Greek wall and threatening their ships, driven by Zeus’ favor. His heroism peaks before his eventual downfall.	aristeia (ἀριστεία) refers to a hero’s moment of supreme valor, a common Homeric motif
Telemachy	Odyssey; Books 1-4	Τηλεμάχεια	The Affairs of Telemachus	Telemachus, Odysseus’ son, journeys to Pylos and Sparta to seek news of his father, guided by Athena. He meets Nestor and Menelaus.	Named after Telemachus (Τηλέμαχος)
Mnesterophonia	Odyssey; Book 22	Μνηστηροφονία	Slaughter of the Suitors	Odysseus, with Telemachus, kills the suitors who have plagued his household, in a brutal and climactic battle.	From μνηστῆρες (suitors) and φονία (slaughter)
Apologoi or Apologue	Odyssey; Books 9-12	Ἀπόλογοι	Tales	Odysseus narrates his adventures to the Phaeacians, including encounters with the Cyclops, Circe, the Sirens, and Scylla and Charybdis.	From ἀπολογέομαι (to narrate or recount)
Patrocleia	Iliad; Book 16	Πατρόκλεια	The Affair of Patroclus	Patroclus, wearing Achilles’ armor, leads the Myrmidons into battle, drives back the Trojans, but is killed by Hector.	Named after Patroclus (Πάτροκλος)
Dios Apate	Iliad; Book 14	Διὸς Ἀπάτη	The Deception of Zeus	Hera seduces Zeus to distract him, allowing Poseidon to aid the Greeks. The scene includes a detailed description of Hera’s preparation and Zeus’ amorous response.	From Διός, the Greek genitive (possessive) form of the name Zeus, and ἀπάτη (deception)
Nostos (of Odysseus)	Odyssey; Books 13-24	νόστος	Odysseus' return home to Ithaca	The entire second half of the Odyssey describes Odysseus' return home to Ithaca and its consequences.	From νόστος (homecoming)
Nostoi (of the shades)	Odyssey; Book 11	νόστοι	(Nekyia, Summoning of the Dead)	In a scene within the Nekyia, the shades of various heroes recount their returns home.	From νόστος (homecoming)
Cyclopeia	Odyssey; Book 9	Κυκλωπεία	-	Odysseus and his men encounter and escape the Cyclops named Polyphemus.	From Κύκλωψ (cyclops, a one-eyed or "disc-eyed" giant)
Epipolesis	Iliad; Book 4	Ἐπιπώλησις	inspection	Agamemnon tours his troops. As he encounters each group, he either praises them for valor, or reproaches them for substandard bravery.	From ἐπιπωλέομαι (visit, inspect) and ἐπιπώλησις (visit, inspection)
Hoplopoiia	Iliad; Book 18	Ὁπλοποιία	-	Hephaestus forges an intricately decorated shield for Achilles.	From ὁπλοποιέω (make weapons)
Catalog of Ships	Iliad; Book 2	νεῶν κατάλογος	-	Book 2 of the Iliad gives the names of the city and the leaders of each contingent of Greeks, and the number of ships required to transport the men. A similar but smaller section in book 2 lists allies to the Trojans.	From κατάλογος (catalog, list) and νεῶν, the genitive (possesive) plural form of ναῦς (ship)
Phaeacian Games	Odyssey; Book 8	-	-	Odysseus lands on the island of the Phaeacians, who stage a series of athletic contests so that Odysseus can spread stories about the Phaeacians' athletic prowess.	-
Funeral games for Patroclus	Iliad; Book 23	Ἆθλα ἐπί Πατρόκλῳ	-	Achilles organizes a series of athletic competitions to honor Patroclus, the fallen Greek hero.	From ἆθλον (game, contest) and Patroclus (Πάτροκλος)
Cretan Lie	Odyssey; Book 14	-	-	A disguised Odysseus narrates to his swineherd the false tale that he was a Cretan soldier of the Trojan War.	-

== Names of types of scenes in Homer's Iliad and Odyssey ==
These names refer generically to several scenes, or to a type of scene, in the Iliad or Odyssey or elsewhere in literature, but do not necessarily point implicitly to any specific scene in Homer's work. These may overlap with the terms above (e.g., ekphrasis and Hoplopoiia).

Name	Example Scene(s)	Greek Name	Alternate Names	Scene Description	Origin of Name
ekphrasis	Iliad; Book 18 (Achilles's shield)	ἔκφρaσiς	-	Vivid, often dramatic, verbal description of a visual work of art, either real or imagined.	From ἐκφράζειν (proclaim or call an inanimate object by name) and ἔκφρaσiς (description)
anagnorisis	Odyssey; Books 16, 19, 23	ἀναγνώρισις	-	Moment when a character makes a critical discovery, such as learning a character's true identity.	From ἀναγιγνώσκω (know again or recognize) and ἀναγνώρισις (recognition)
aristeia	Iliad (many such scenes)	ἀριστεία	-	Scene where a hero in battle has his finest moments.	From ἀριστεία (excellence)
xenia	Iliad, Odyssey (many scenes)	ξενία	-	Scene depicting "guest-friendship" or "ritualized friendship", that is, institutionalized relationship rooted in generosity, gift exchange, and reciprocity.	From ξενία (hospitality)
theomachy	Iliad; Books 20,21	θεομαχία	theomachia	In Iliad book 20, Zeus grants the gods permission to intervene in the Trojan War. In book 21 there is actual fighting between Hera and Artemis.	From θέος (god) and μάχη (battle, quarrel)

== See also ==
- Hysminai (Battles)
- Machai (Wars)
- Phonoi (Murders)
- Androktasiai (Manslayings)
- Hesiod, Theogony
