= Theomachy =

Battle among gods in Greek mythology

A theomachy (Ancient Greek: Θεομαχία) is a battle among gods in Greek mythology. An early example is the Titanomachy (War of the Titans), in which the elder Olympian Gods fought against the preceding generation, the Titans. The war lasted ten years and resulted in the victory of the Olympians and their dominion over the world. Another case is the Gigantomachy, the battle fought between the Giants - the children of Gaia - and all the Olympian gods for supremacy of the cosmos.

In the Iliad, multiple theomachies occur. One is fought between Diomedes with the direct aid of Athena against Ares and Aphrodite (part of Diomedes' aristeia in Book 5). The divine couple is wounded by the spear guided by Athena; this is the first theomachy to occur chronologically in the Iliad. Book 20 begins with Zeus' grant of permission to the gods to participate in the battle and is traditionally known under the title Theomachia. In Book 21 (478ff.) there is fighting between Hera and Artemis. This battle is shown by Homer to be almost playful as Hera is smiling while she boxes the ears of Artemis, which causes Artemis to fly away in tears. Seeing this, Hermes refuses to fight Leto and encourages to tell everyone she beat him. In Book 21, Poseidon challenges Apollo to fight, but Apollo rejects his offer and comments on the triviality of gods fighting over the whims of mortals while their own pain from injury would be transitory and quickly healed. The Theomachy is purposely added to show the unbridgeable gap between mortal men and the immortals who rule them; by showing the triviality of divine pain, human suffering is highlighted.

The English word theomachist is used to refer to an individual who resists God or his will.

== See also ==
- Æsir–Vanir War
- Asuras
- Devas
- Jacob wrestling with the angel
- War in Heaven
- Homeric scenes with proper names
