= Kleos =

Theme in Ancient Greek literature

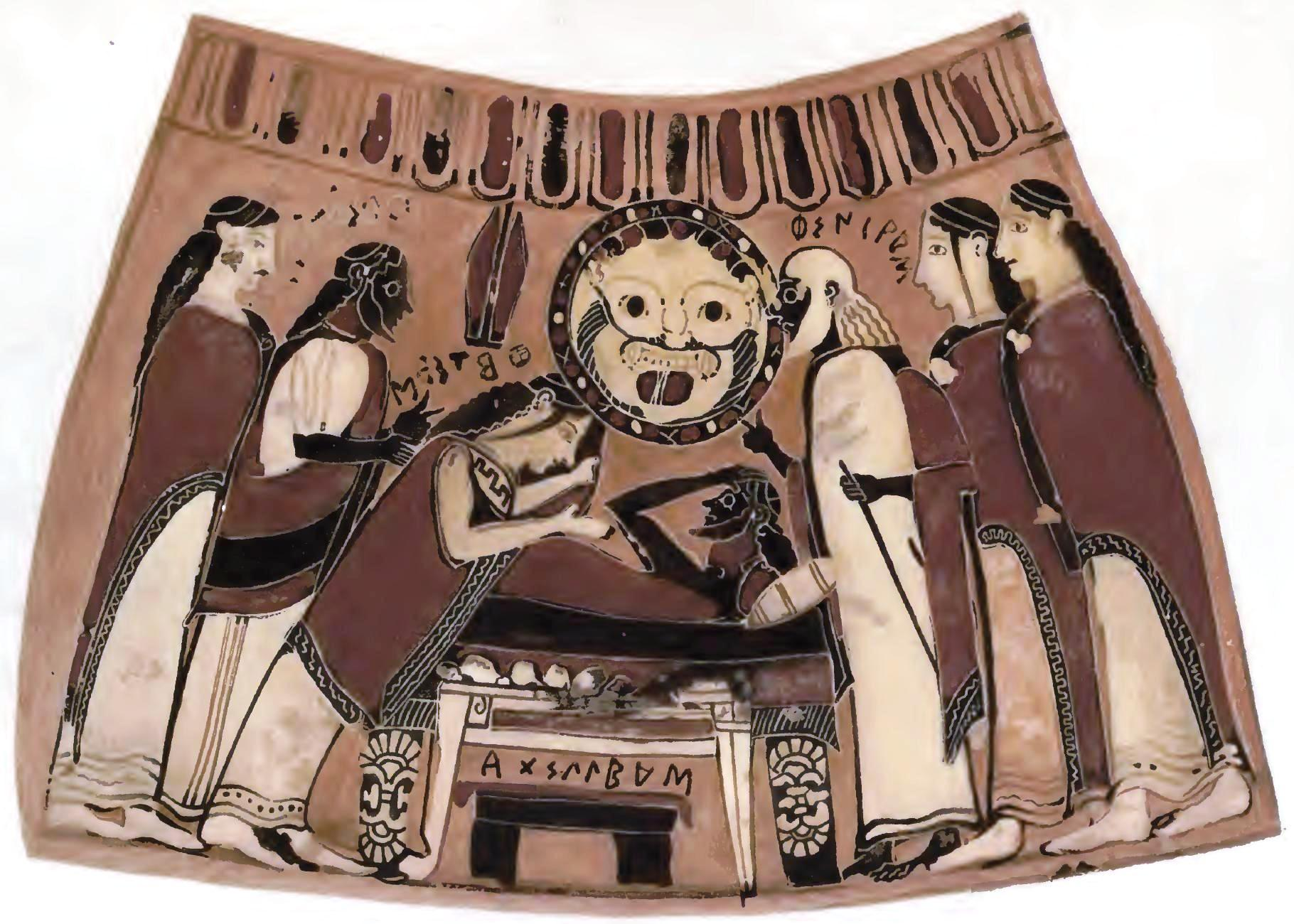
Achilles mourning the death of Patroclus. Corinthian Chytra

Kleos (Ancient Greek: κλέος) is the Greek word often translated to "renown" or "glory". It is related to the English word "loud" and carries the implied meaning of "what others hear about you". A Greek hero earns kleos through accomplishing great deeds.

According to Gregory Nagy, besides the meaning of "glory", kleos can also be used as the medium (in this case, the ancient Greek poetry or song) which conveys glory.

Kleos is invariably transferred from father to son; the son is responsible for carrying on and building upon the "glory" of the father. This is a reason for Penelope putting off her suitors for so long, and one justification for Medea's murder of her own children was to cut short Jason's kleos.

Kleos is a common theme in Homer's epics, the Iliad and the Odyssey, the main example in the latter being that of Odysseus and his son Telemachus, who is concerned that his father may have died a pathetic and pitiable death at sea rather than a reputable and gracious one in battle. The Iliad is about gaining ultimate kleos on the battlefields of Troy while the Odyssey is the ten-year quest of Odysseus' nostos (or return journey). Telemachus fears that he has been deprived of kleos. This links to hereditary kleos, as heroes obtain immortality through eternal fame of their actions and lineage.

== Etymology ==
According to Nagy, kleos is a noun, derived from the verb kluein, which means 'hear'.

From other sources, the Greek term kleos is derived from the Proto-Indo-European (PIE) term *ḱléwos, which expressed a similar concept in PIE society. As the PIE people had no concept of the continuation of the individual after life, one could only hope to achieve *ḱléwos *n̥d^{h}g^{wh}itóm, or "the fame that does not decay." As Bruce Lincoln notes, "In a universe where impersonal matter endured forever but the personal self was extinguished at death, the most which could survive of that self was a rumor, a reputation. For this, the person craving immortality—a condition proper only to the gods and antithetical to human existence—was totally reliant on poets and poetry."

Cognates include Sanskrit, श्रवस् (śravas); Avestan, 𐬯𐬭𐬀𐬬𐬀𐬵; Armenian, լու (low); Old Church Slavonic slava, and Old Irish, clú. Compare to the Greek: κλύω (klúō - I hear).

== Plato ==
The Greek philosopher Plato, in his dialog Symposium devoted to discussing love, digresses into the subject of fame and glory. This comes in the section that concerns the dialog between Socrates and Diotima. She is explaining that men search for some kind of immortality, for instance by means of physical and intellectual procreation. She then asserts that the love for fame and glory is very strong, and in fact to obtain them, men are ready to engage in great efforts, and also run risks and sacrifices, even of their lives (self-sacrifice), and will sacrifice still more for this than for their children. She then references Alcestis (who died to save Admetus), Achilles (to avenge Patroclus), and Codrus, as examples of heroes in search of fame and immortal renown.

Plato believed "There's a victory, and defeat; the first and best of victories, the lowest and worst of defeats which each man gains or sustains at the hands not of another, but of himself." Plato emphasized that victory is self-motivated, while glory is to benefit future victory.

Plato's specific commentary about life's glories that "The first and best victory is to conquer self. To be conquered by self is, of all things, the most shameful and vile." has been later referenced by magazines and newspapers such as the American news publication Forbes (in June 1928).

== See also ==
- Gestaþáttr
