= Peripeteia =

Reversal of circumstances, turning point

Peripeteia (/ˌpɛrəpɪˈteɪ.ə/, peripety, alternative Latin form: Peripetīa, ultimately from Greek: περιπέτεια) is a reversal of circumstances, or turning point, within a work of literature.

== Aristotle's view ==
Aristotle, in his Poetics, defines peripeteia as "a change by which the action veers round to its opposite, subject always to our rule of probability or necessity." According to Aristotle, peripeteia, along with discovery, is the most effective when it comes to drama, particularly in a tragedy. He wrote that "The finest form of Discovery is one attended by Peripeteia, like that which goes with the Discovery in Oedipus...".

Aristotle says that peripeteia is the most powerful part of a plot in a tragedy along with discovery (anagnorisis). A peripety is the change of the kind described from one state of things within the play to its opposite, and that too in the way we are saying, in the probable or necessary sequence of events. There is often no element like Peripeteia; it can bring forth or result in terror, mercy, or in comedies it can bring a smile or it can bring forth tears (Rizo).

This is the best way to spark and maintain attention throughout the various form and genres of drama "Tragedy imitates good actions and, thereby, measures and depicts the well-being of its protagonist. But in his formal definition, as well as throughout the Poetics, Aristotle emphasizes that" ... Tragedy is an imitation not only of a complete action, but also of events inspiring fear or pity" (1452a 1); in fact, at one point Aristotle isolates the imitation of "actions that excite pity and fear" as "the distinctive mark of tragic imitation" (1452b 30).

Pity and fear are effected through reversal and recognition; and these "most powerful elements of emotional interest in Tragedy-Peripeteia or Reversal of the Situation, and recognition scenes-are parts of the plot (1450a 32). has the shift of the tragic protagonist's fortune from good to bad, which is essential to the plot of a tragedy. It is often an ironic twist. Good uses of Peripeteia are those that especially are parts of a complex plot, so that they are defined by their changes of fortune being accompanied by reversal, recognition, or both" (Smithson).

Peripeteia includes changes of character, but also more external changes. A character who becomes rich and famous from poverty and obscurity has undergone peripeteia, even if his character remains the same.

When a character learns something he had been previously ignorant of, this is normally distinguished from peripeteia as anagnorisis or discovery, a distinction derived from Aristotle's work.

Aristotle considers anagnorisis, leading to peripeteia, the mark of a superior tragedy. Two such plays are Oedipus Rex, where the oracle's information that Oedipus has killed his father and married his mother brings about his mother's death and his own blindness and exile, and Iphigenia in Tauris, where Iphigenia realizes that the strangers she is to sacrifice are her brother and his friend, resulting in all three of them escaping Tauris. These plots he considered complex and superior to simple plots without anagnorisis or peripeteia, such as when Medea resolves to kill her children, knows they are her children, and does so. Aristotle identified Oedipus Rex as the principal work demonstrating peripety. (See Aristotle's Poetics.)

== Examples ==
=== Oedipus Rex ===
In Sophocles' Oedipus Rex, the peripeteia occurs towards the end of the play when the Messenger brings Oedipus news of his parentage. In the play, Oedipus is fated to murder his father and marry his mother. His parents, Laius and Jocasta, try to forestall the oracle by sending their son away to be killed, but he is actually raised by Polybus and his wife, Merope, the rulers of another kingdom. The irony of the Messenger’s information is that it was supposed to comfort Oedipus and assure him that he was the son of Polybus. Unfortunately for Oedipus, the Messenger says, "Polybus was nothing to you, [Oedipus] that’s why, not in blood" (Sophocles 1113).

The Messenger received Oedipus from one of Laius’ servants and then gave him to Polybus. The plot comes together when Oedipus realizes that he is the son and murderer of Laius as well as the son and husband of Jocasta. Martin M. Winkler says that here, peripeteia and anagnorisis occur at the same time "for the greatest possible impact" because Oedipus has been "struck a blow from above, as if by fate or the gods. He is changing from the mighty and somewhat arrogant king of Thebes to a figure of woe" (Winkler 57).

=== Hecabe ===
Hecabe (also spelled Hecuba) by Euripides has also been interpreted as a case of peripetia. Karl Otfried Müller, in History of the Literature of Ancient Greece, writes, "The revolution, or peripeteia, of the piece consists in this, that Hecuba, though now cast down into the lowest abyss of misery, no longer gives way to fruitless wailings." The play is centered around reversals of power and expectations.

Hecabe was the queen of Troy during the Trojan War. She was married to Priam, the king, and was the mother of Hector, Cassandra, Paris, Polyxena, and Polydorus. When the play opens, Troy has already fallen. Hector and Paris are dead, and Cassandra has been abducted by Agamemnon. Hecabe, the former queen, is being held as a slave in a camp by the Greek victors.

Now utterly powerless, she is unable to save her youngest daughter. Polyxena dies after the ghost of Achilles appears over his tomb and demands Polyxena as a sacrifice. Hecabe begs Odysseus to spare Polyxena's life to no avail. As Polyxena is led away to her death, she behaves nobly, and says that she would rather die than live as slave.

After Polyxena's death, Hecabe suffers another blow. She finds the body of her youngest son, Polydorus, washed ashore. He was under the aegis of Polymestor, the King of Thrace and supposed friend of Priam, who was paid handsomely to protect the boy. But after Troy is destroyed, Polymestor decides to murder Polydorus and abscond the gold. Her grief, coupled with this newfound betrayal, incites a desire for revenge.

Although a captive, she persuades Agamemnon to allow her to talk to Polymestor. Once her wish is granted, she lures Polymestor and his sons into the Trojan's women's quarters with false promises of more gold, good bait for such an avaricious man. Then, the Trojan women attack. They blind Polymestor and kill his young sons.

Polymestor appeals to Agamemnon for help, expecting to receive it, but Hecabe exposes his betrayal and murder of Polydorus, along with his other lies. Shifting expectations lead to Agamemnon ruling in favor of Hecabe and against Polymestor. Agamemnon finds Polymestor guilty, for what he did to Polydorus was an egregious violation of guest-friendship, a value the Greeks hold dear.

=== Conversion of Paul on the road to Damascus ===
The instantaneous conversion of Paul on the road to Damascus is a classic example of peripeteia, which Eusebius presented in his Life of Constantine as a pattern for the equally revelatory conversion of Constantine. Modern biographers of Constantine see his conversion less as a momentary phenomenon than as a step in a lifelong process.

=== The Three Apples ===
In "The Three Apples", a medieval Arabian Nights, after the murderer reveals himself near the middle of the story, he explains his reasons behind the murder in a flashback, which begins with him going on a journey to find three rare apples for his wife, but after returning finds out she cannot eat them due to her lingering illness. Later at work, he sees a slave passing by with one of those apples claiming that he received it from his girlfriend, a married woman with three such apples her husband gave her. He returns home and demands his wife to show him all three apples, but she only shows him two. This convinces him of her infidelity and he murders her as a result. After he disposes of her body, he returns home, where his son confesses that he had stolen one of the apples and that a slave, to whom he had told about his father's journey, had fled with it. The murderer thus realizes his guilt and regrets what he has just done.

The second use of peripety occurs near the end. After finding out about the culprit behind the murder, the protagonist Ja'far ibn Yahya is ordered by Harun al-Rashid to find the tricky slave within three days, or else he will have Ja'far executed instead. After the deadline has passed, Ja'far prepares to be executed for his failure and bids his family farewell. As he hugs his youngest daughter, he feels a round object in her pocket, which is revealed to be the same apple that the culprit was holding. In the story's twist ending, the daughter reveals that she obtained it from their slave, Rayhan. Ja'far thus realizes that his own slave was the culprit all along. He then finds Rayhan and solves the case, preventing his own execution. That was a plot twist.

== See also ==
- Chiastic structure
- Deus ex machina
- Eucatastrophe
