= Teichoscopy =

Narrative device in classical literature

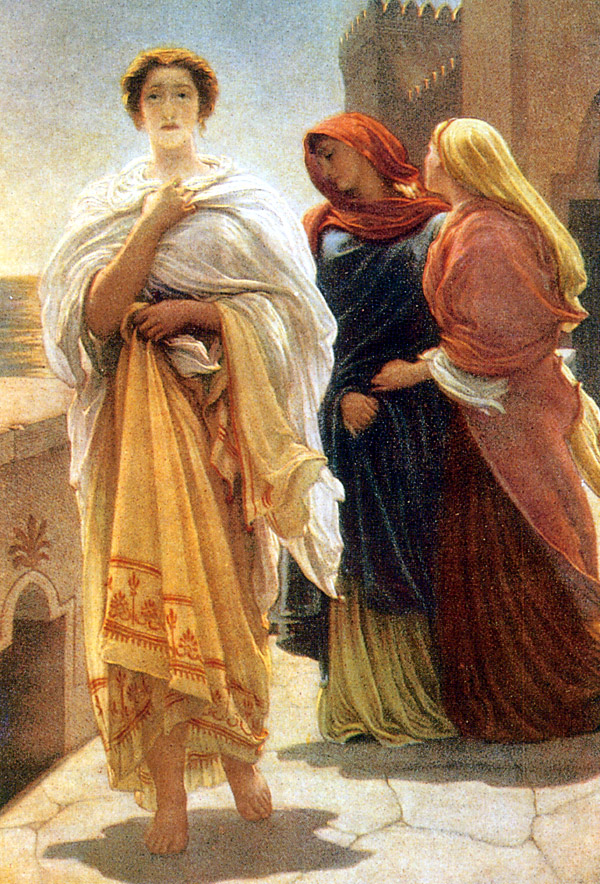
Helen on the Walls of Troy (1865) by Frederic Leighton

Teichoscopy or teichoscopia (Ancient Greek: τειχοσκοπία), meaning "viewing from the walls", is a recurring narrative strategy in ancient Greek literature. One famous instance of teichoscopy occurs in Homer's Iliad, Book 3, lines 121–244.

The passage begins with Helen approached in her chamber by Iris, disguised as her sister-in-law Laodice, the daughter of Priam. Helen is then led to the walls of the Skaian gates, where she is summoned by Priam, who asks her to point out the Achaean heroes she sees on the Trojan plain. Below her, the two armies are preparing for the duel between Menelaus and Paris. Helen identifies Agamemnon, Odysseus, Telamonian (Greater) Ajax, and Idomeneus. She also mentions that she does not see her brothers Castor and Pollux, who unbeknownst to her are already dead back in Greece. After this scene, the duel commences, with both armies praying to Zeus and the rest of the gods on Olympus to open the action.

== Analysis ==
According to Maria C. Pantelia, Helen becomes the 'author' of a catalog when she describes for Priam the qualities of the most important Greek warriors. It has been suggested that the teichoscopy, as well as the duel between Paris and Menelaus, would have more likely occurred at the beginning of the war rather than during its tenth year. However, although Homer is not at the beginning of the Trojan War, he is at the beginning of the poem and therefore uses the teichoscopia as a poetic structure that provides information and suspense important for the remainder of the play and the duel to come.

Although teichoscopy can be viewed as simply a vignette that surveys the major Greek warriors, it has been suggested that Homer is also trying to reveal something about Helen. Helen's open admiration of both the Greek and Trojan warriors is viewed as ironic, as it seems odd that the major cause of a war that has brought devastation to the Trojans should praise the enemy. However, by doing this, Homer is, according to Frederic Will, “insisting on the importance, and centrality, of Helen’s viewpoint. He is integrating a traditional form artistically.”

The main object of teichoscopy is the synchronous discussion of events, as opposed to events being reported later by messengers or other eyewitnesses. It is a well-established technique in dramaturgy. For example, teichoscopeia is a key device in the drama "Penthesilea" by Heinrich von Kleist. At the time of writing (1808) the work was considered unsuitable for stage production because of the unusually high frequency of teichoscopic events, and the first stage production was not undertaken until half a century later. However, in the twentieth century further stage productions as well as opera, radio and film versions followed (cf. Penthesilea (Kleist)).

== See also ==
- Homeric scenes with proper names
