= Deception of Zeus =

Section of the Iliad

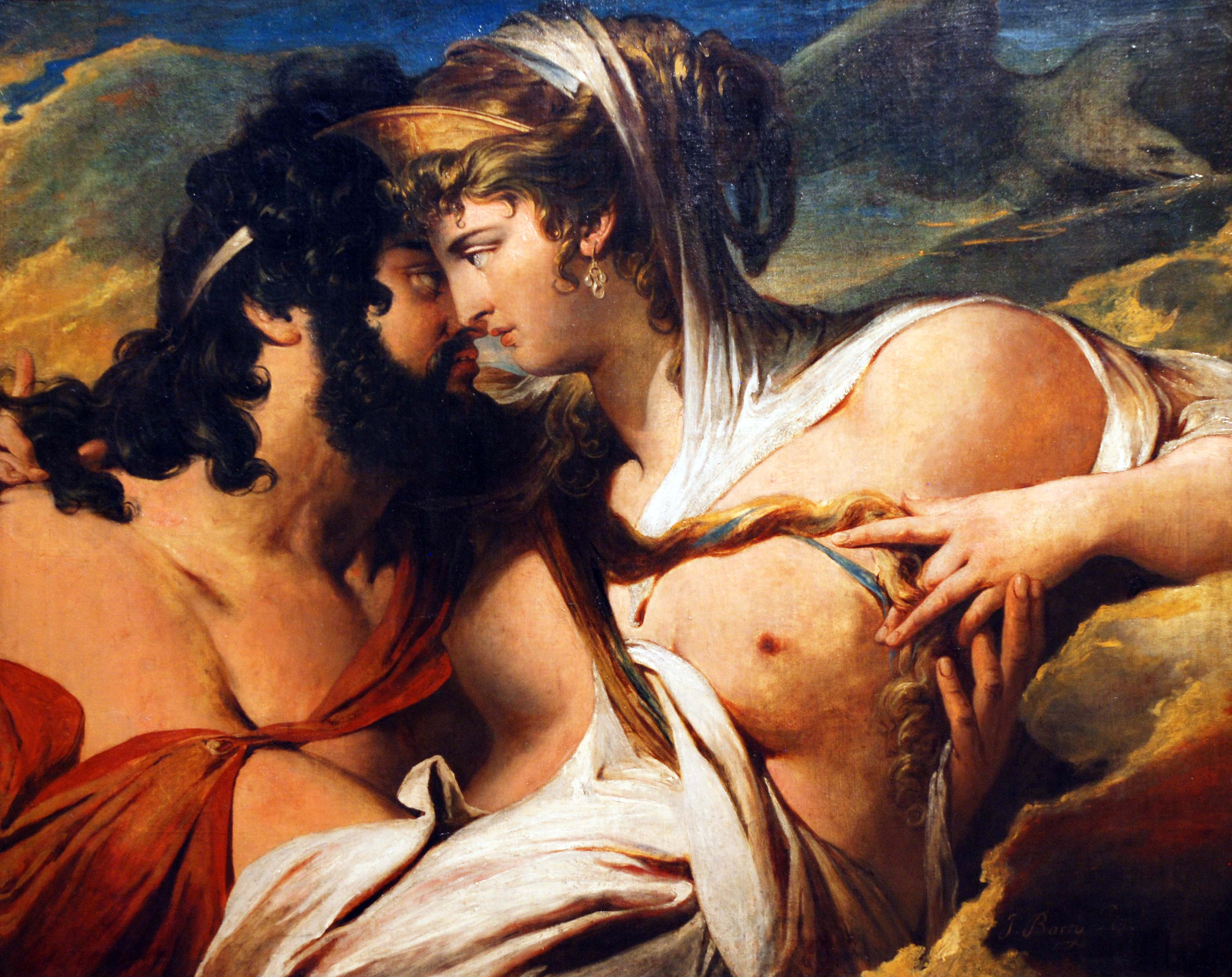
Jupiter and Juno on Mount Ida by James Barry, 1773 (City Art Galleries, Sheffield.)

The section of the Iliad that ancient editors called the Dios apate (Ancient Greek: Διός ἀπάτη, the "Deception of Zeus") stands apart from the remainder of Book XIV. In this episode, Hera beautifies herself in preparation for seducing Zeus and obtains the help of Aphrodite, telling her she wishes to go to Oceanus, "origin of the gods", and Tethys the "mother". Instead she goes to Zeus and they have sex hidden within a golden cloud on the summit of Mount Ida. By distracting Zeus, Hera makes it possible for the Achaeans to regain the upper hand in the Trojan War.

== Literary issues ==
The peculiarities of this episode were already being discussed in Antiquity. Even early commentators were shocked by the storyline and its implications for the morality of the gods. An expression of this moral criticism is found in Plato's Republic.

Later, as it became fashionable to question whether certain passages of the known text of the Iliad were really composed by Homer (see Homeric scholarship), the genuineness of the "Deception of Zeus" was doubted. Albrecht Dihle listed the linguistic features unique to this section and "found so many deviations from the normal traditional use of Homeric formulas that he concluded that this section of the Iliad could not belong to the phase of oral tradition but was a written composition." Richard Janko, by contrast, describes the episode as "a bold, brilliant, graceful, sensuous, and above all amusing virtuoso performance, wherein Homer parades his mastery of the other types of epic composition in his repertoire". The debate on this issue is not yet settled.

Walter Burkert found that the passage "shows divinity in a naturalistic, cosmic setting which is not otherwise a feature of Homeric anthropomorphism", and linked it to the opening of the Babylonian Enuma Elish where Apsu and Tiamat, respectively the fresh and salt waters, are the primordial couple who "were mixing their waters."

Like Tethys and Oceanus, Apsu and Tiamat were superseded by a later generation of gods. However, Tethys does not otherwise appear in early Greek myth and she had no established cult.

Adrian Kelly argued against such Mesopotamian influence of the passage: The "naturalistic, cosmic setting" is not particularly special for the Iliad, as the insurrection of the Olympians and the description of the Tartaros can be viewed as equally "naturalistic". Seeing Okeanos and Tethys as the primordial couple as in the Enuma Elish depends on translation and interpretation of the Greek source. Burkert's proposing of Tiamat as the etymology for Tethys turns out to be wrong.

== See also ==
- Homeric scenes with proper names

== Sources ==
- Walter Burkert (1992). The Orientalizing Revolution: Near Eastern Influence on Greek Culture in the Early Archaic Period. Harvard University Press.
- Albrecht Dihle (1970). Homer-Probleme.
- Richard Janko (1994). The Iliad: A Commentary. Vol. 4: Books 13-16. Cambridge: Cambridge University Press.
