= Nekyia =

Ancient Greek cult practice

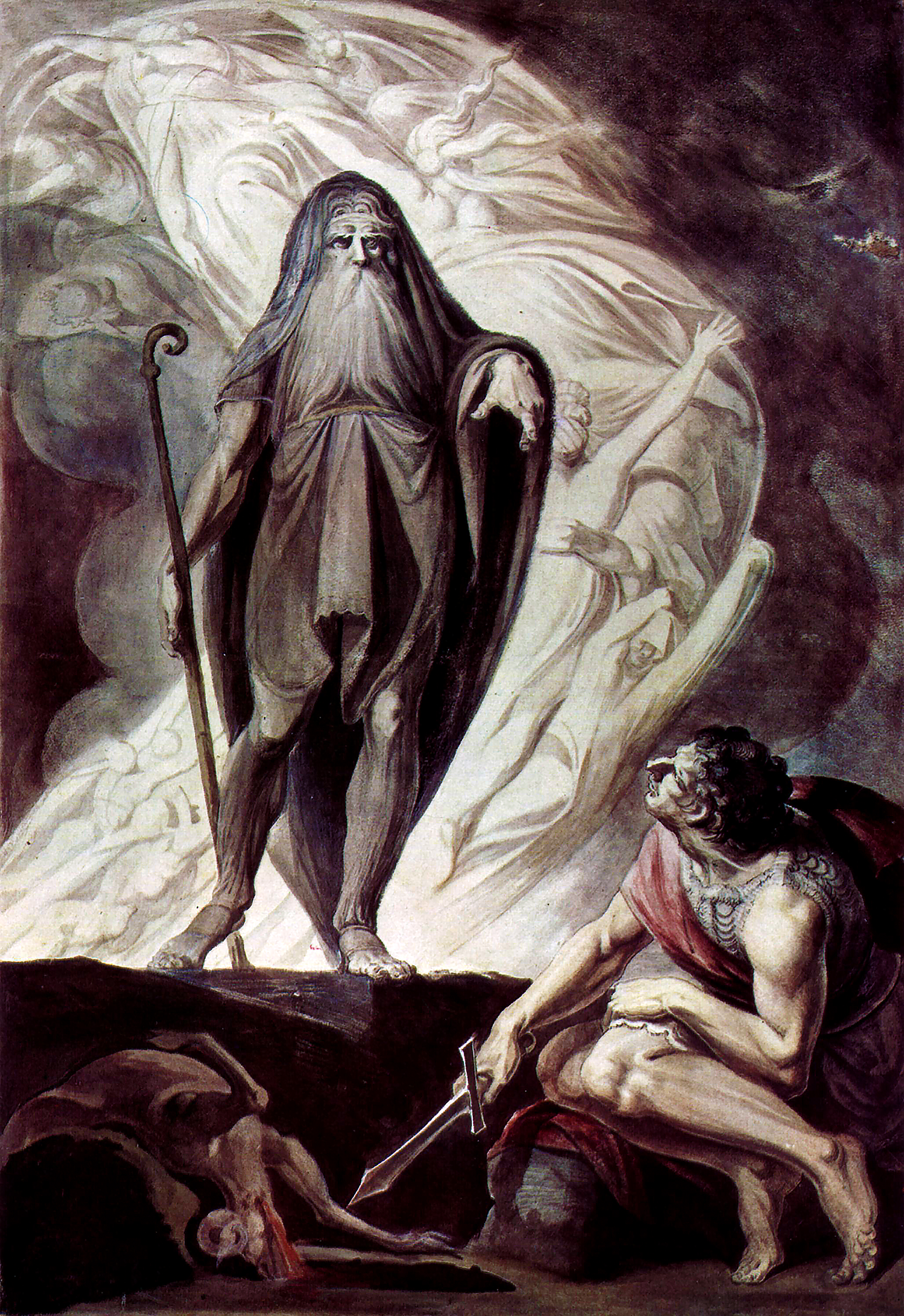
The Shade of Tiresias Appearing to Odysseus during the Sacrifice (c. 1780-85), painting by Johann Heinrich Füssli, showing a scene from Book Eleven of the Odyssey

In ancient Greek cult practice and literature, a nekyia or nekya (Ancient Greek: νέκυια, νεκυία; νεκύα) is a "rite by which ghosts were called up and questioned about the future," i.e., necromancy. A nekyia is not necessarily the same thing as a katabasis. While they both afford the opportunity to converse with the dead, only a katabasis is the actual, physical journey to the underworld undertaken by several heroes in Greek and Roman myth.

In common parlance, however, the term "nekyia" is often used to subsume both types of event, so that by Late Antiquity for example "Olympiodorus ... claimed that three [Platonic] myths were classified as nekyia (an underworld story, as in Homer's Odyssey book 11)".

== Questioning ghosts ==
Several sites in Greece and Italy were dedicated wholly or in part to this practice. "The Underworld communicated with the earth by direct channels. These were caverns whose depths were unplumbed, like that of Heraclea Pontica." The most notable was the Necromanteion of Acheron in the town of Ephyra in southwestern Epirus in what is now northwestern Greece. Other oracles of the dead could be found at Taenaron and Avernus.

Such specialized locations, however, were not the only places where necromancy was performed. One could also perform the rite at a tomb, for example. Among the gods associated with the nekyia rite are Hades, his wife Persephone, Hecate, and Hermes in his capacity as psychopompus – one who escorted souls to Hades.

== The Odyssey ==
The earliest reference to this cult practice comes from Book 11 of the Odyssey, which was called the Nekyia in Classical antiquity. Odysseus was instructed to "make a journey of a very different kind, and find your way to the Halls of Hades ... across the River of Ocean". There he consults the soul of the priest and prophet Tiresias about the means to return home to Ithaca, in a setting of "ghosts and dark blood and eerie noises, like a canvas of Hieronymous Bosch". He sacrifices a ram and an ewe so that "the countless shades of the dead and gone" would "surge around" him and then he meets and talks to the souls of the dead.

"The story of Odysseus's journey to Hades ... was followed ... by further accounts of such journeys undertaken by other heroes", although it is clear that, for example, "the κατάβασις [katabasis, "descent"] of Herakles in its traditional form must have differed noticeably from the Nekyia".

The Athenian playwright Aeschylus features the use of tombside nekyiai in his Persians and Libation Bearers.

== The Aeneid ==
In the Aeneid, Aeneas descends into the House of Hades and travels through the world of the dead. In this, his journey differs from that of Odysseus, who merely journeys to the entrance of the Underworld to perform the ritual sacrifice needed to summon the spirits of the dead, the ghosts whose knowledge he seeks.

== Menippus and Lucian of Samosata ==
Lucian of Samosata is the author of a satirical dialogue titled Μένιππος ἢ Νεκυομαντεία, dating from 161–162 CE, which, as German classical philologist Rudolf Helm (1872–1966) argues, may be an epitome of the lost Nekyia of cynic philosopher Menippus. In The Lives of the Philosophers, Diogenes Laërtius lists the Nekyia among the thirteen works composed by Menippus (Vitae philosophorum, VI, 101). In Lucian's dialogue, Menippus, perplexed by the conflicting accounts of the afterlife put forward by Homer, Hesiod, the philosophers, and the tragic poets, decides to discover the truth for himself. He therefore enlists the help of a Babylonian Magus, named Mithrobarzanes, in order to visit the underworld. Mithrobarzanes performs a necromantic ritual, and the two descend to Hades, where they see Pyriphlegethon, Cerberus, the palace of Pluto, Charon, and the rest of the mythological machinery of the Greek underworld. Ultimately, the underworld setting serves Lucian as a vehicle for satire on not only the rich and powerful, but also the philosophers.

== Jung ==
C. G. Jung used the concept of Nekyia as an integral part of his analytical psychology: "Nekyia ... introversion of the conscious mind into the deeper layers of the unconscious psyche". For Jung, "the Nekyia is no aimless or destructive fall into the abyss, but a meaningful katabasis ... its object the restoration of the whole man".

Jolande Jacobi added that "this 'great Nekyia' ... is interwoven with innumerable lesser Nekyia experiences".

=== Night sea-journey ===
Jung used the images of the Nekyia—"the night journey on the sea ... descend[ing] into the belly of the monster (journey to hell)"—and of "'Katabasis' (descent into the lower world)" almost interchangeably. His closest followers also saw them as indistinguishable metaphors for "a descent into the dark, hot depths of the unconscious ... a journey to hell and 'death'" – emphasising, for example, that "the great arc of the night sea journey comprises many lesser rhythms, lesser arcs on the same 'primordial pattern,'" just like the nekyia.

The post-Jungian James Hillman however made some clear distinctions among them:

The descent of the underworld can be distinguished from the night sea-journey of the hero in many ways… the hero returns from the night sea-journey in better shape for the tasks of life, whereas the nekyia takes the soul into a depth for its own sake so that there is no "return." The night sea-journey is further marked by building interior heat (tapas), whereas the nekyia goes below that pressured containment, that tempering in the fires of passion, to a zone of utter coldness ... The devil image still haunts in our fears of the unconscious and the latent psychosis that supposedly lurks there, and we still turn to methods of Christianism – moralizing, kind feelings, communal sharing, and childlike naivete – as propitiations against our fear, instead of classical descent into it, the nekyia into imagination… (Only) after his nekyia, Freud, like Aeneas (who carried his father on his back), could finally enter "Rome".

== Cultural references ==
- "Thomas Mann's conception of the nekyia draws extensively from 'the doctrines of the East...Gnosticism, and Hellenism'".
- Jung viewed Picasso's "early Blue Period ... as the symbol of 'Nekya', a descent into hell and darkness".
- In 1937, English composer Michael Tippett planned a large choral work based on Jungian concepts, titled Nekyia. The work would become the basis of his secular oratorio, A Child of Our Time.

== See also ==
- Odyssey
- Geography of the Odyssey
- Witch of Endor, similar passage in the Bible
- Homeric scenes with proper names
