= Aristeia =

Scene of heroic excellence

An aristeia or aristia (/ˌærɪˈstiːə/; Ancient Greek: ἀριστεία [aristěːaː], "excellence") is a narrative element in the dramatic conventions of epic poetry. Studied particularly in Homeric works and in the Cycle, an aristeia describes the actions of a single hero (the aristeuôn) within a larger battle. Literally, "moment of excellence", aristeiai often coincide with battleground slaughter and feature one warrior who dominates the battle by conquering a series of foes. Aristeia may result in the death of the hero, and therefore suggests a "battle in which he reaches his peak as a fighter and hero".

== Historical background ==
In the pre-hoplite phase of Greek military evolution, the well-armed aristocrat was the major focus of military action, placed at the apex of his less well-armed dependents. This was reflected in the Homeric division between nobility and commoners, and in the regular epic struggles of the former.

== Literary elements ==
Tilman Krischer describes the primary elements of a typical aristeia in his landmark analysis "Formale Konventionen der homerischen Epik" as:

1. The arming of the aristeuôn and the description of the weapons used in battle.
2. The emergence of the aristeuôn onto the battlefield to kill a series of named and unnamed opponents.
3. The wounding of the aristeuôn and subsequent recovery through divine intervention.
4. Victory over a major hero and a battle over the corpse of the defeated foe.

This framework of motifs is often altered to abbreviate or expand the heroic narrative.

== Examples ==
=== Iliad ===
There are four prominent examples of aristeia in the Iliad: that of Diomedes in Book 5, that of Agamemnon in Book 11, that of Patroclus in Book 16, and finally that of Achilles in Books 19 to 22. These function as the "major compositional unit" of the Iliad and constitue much of its narrative. The trajectory of Hector meets some of the motifs that constitute an aristeia but as they are spread throughout the poem is argued to not be a true example.

Diomedes' aristeia is described over the course of 400 verses in Book 5. In this episode, Diomedes attacks the Trojan army, killing several, before being wounded by an arrow shot by the archer Pandarus. Athena responds to the prayer of Diomedes by healing him and he continues on to kill Pandarus. Diomedes then duels Aeneas, who is saved from defeat by Aphrodite. Diomedes manages to wound Aphrodite during the course of this rescue. The aristeia ends with Apollo forcing Diomedes to retreat.

Agamemnon's aristeia begins with an arming scene before his rampage prompts Zeus to warn Hector against meeting him in battle. After killing many Trojan warriors, he is injured by Koon. The pain of the wound causes him to withdraw.

Patroclus' aristeia comprises the entirety of Book 16. Patroclus dons Achilles' armor and leads the Greeks as they kill many Trojans including Sarpedon whose corpse is retrieved by Apollo. Patroclus meets Hector in battle, first killing his charioteer, whose corpse is claimed by the Greeks. Patroclus charges the Trojans and, after being struck by Apollo and by the Trojan Euphorbus, he is finally killed by Hector.

Achilles' aristeia begins with his armament in Book 19 by Thetis while the battle does not take place until Books 20–22. In a long and ferocious effort to exact revenge for the death of Patroclus, Achilles reenters the battle to kill Hector. He faces Aeneas who is saved by Poseidon. Achilles kills a large number of Trojan warriors and overcomes the river Scamander with divine intervention from Athena and Poseidon before being lured astray in a ruse by Apollo. Book 22 describes the killing of Hector to culminate the aristeia.

Other Iliadic examples show the exploits of Teucer (Book 8), Odysseus (Book 11), and Idomeneus (Book 13).

=== Odyssey ===
In Book 22 of the Odyssey, Odysseus slaughters all of the suitors in his palace. Aristeia also suggests the qualities of the hero that make his great deeds possible, such as Odysseus' polymetis ("cunning intelligence") that allows him to triumph over the Cyclops Polyphemus in Book 9 of the Odyssey.

=== Aeneid ===
Aristeia is also seen, to some extent, in the Aeneid, when Nisus and Euryalus leave the Trojan defenses in Book 9 to slaughter the Latin captains while they sleep. It also features in Book 10, when Mezentius takes the place of Turnus and strikes down all in his path: it draws upon Homeric models, using a simile. Camilla also has an aristeia in Book 11 killing twelve opponents before her death.

== Recent examples ==
In the film 300, individual Spartan deaths are often portrayed as a Homeric aristeia.

== See also ==
- Arete (excellence)
- Homeric scenes with proper names
