= Cretan Lie =

Proto-historical tale within the Odyssey

The Cretan Lie refers to an episode within the Odyssey in which Odysseus, arriving to his homeland Ithaca in disguise, relays a fabricated story of his exploits against Egypt to the loyal swine herd, Eumaeus. Part of the story is later told by Odysseus to others including to his wife Penelope.

This story has been subjected to much inquiry in the field of the history and archaeology of the end of the Late Bronze Age.

== Synopsis ==
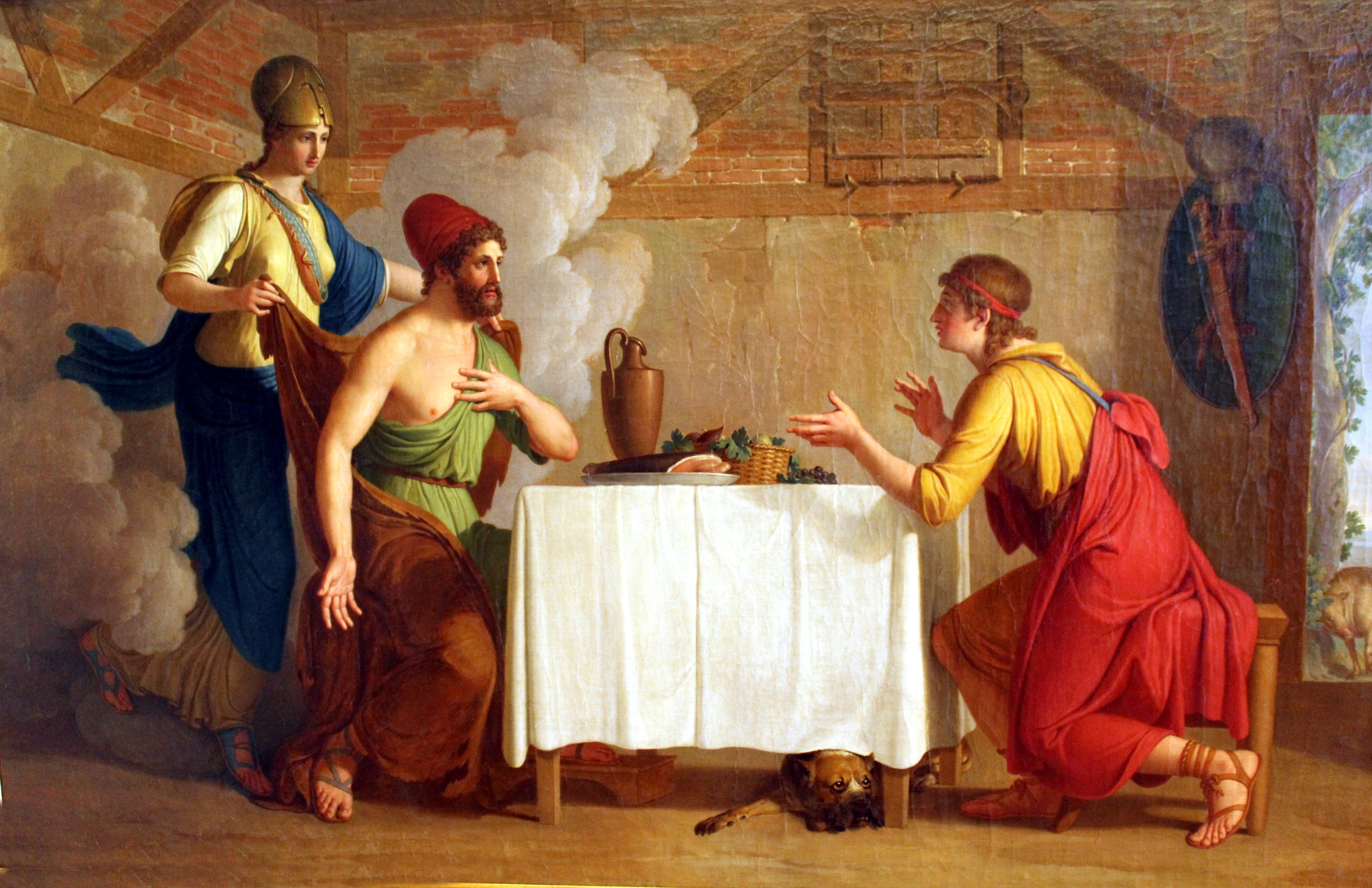
Odysseus in the hut of Eumaeus

In his story, Odysseus cannot return to Crete following the Trojan War and, by divine provocation, is forced to launch an expedition against the Egyptians. Odysseus's fleet is routed due to Zeus's wrath, but the Egyptian king takes pity on Odysseus. Odysseus amasses wealth in Egypt but later loses it in a ship wreck.

But a spirit in me urged, 'Set sail for Egypt—

fit out ships, take crews of seasoned heroes!' Nine I fitted out, the men joined up at once

and then six days my shipmates feasted well

But swept away by their own reckless fury, the crew went berserk—

they promptly began to plunder the lush Egyptian farms, dragged off the women and children, killed the men.

Outcries reached the city in no time—stirred by shouts

- Homer, Odyssey Book XIV

== Historical significance ==
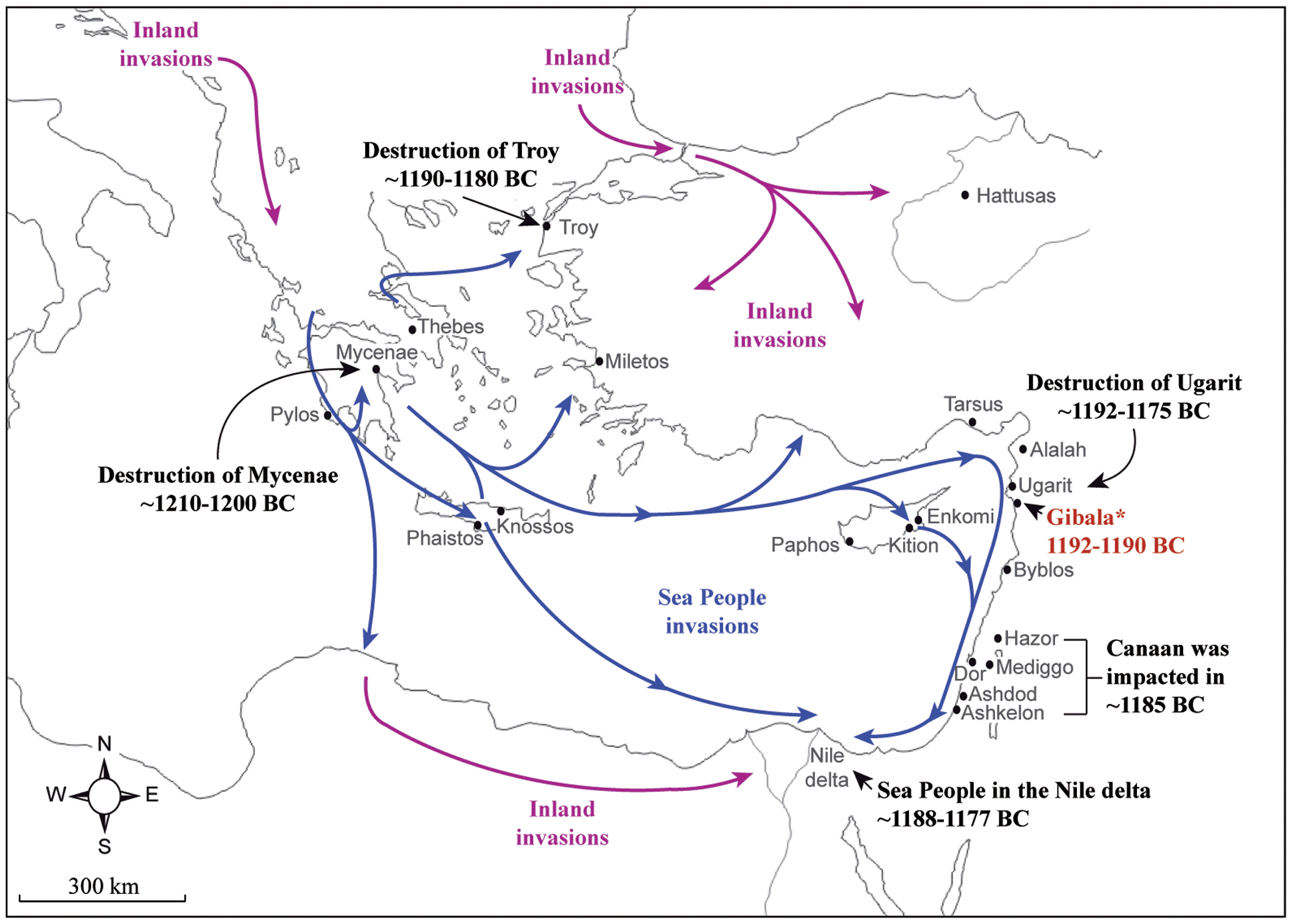
Map of the raids of the Sea Peoples mirroring the account of Odysseus

The significance of this story is the topic of much scholarly analysis particularly with its close parallels to the story of the Sea Peoples and the Battle of the Nile as recorded at the mortuary temple of Ramses III at Medinet Habu. Likewise, Ramses II's adoption of invading Sherden into his bodyguard reflects Odysseus's residence and enrichment in Egypt. It is then speculated that Odysseus's lie reflected some historical fact of the Late Bronze Age Collapse from the oral traditions of the Mycenean Greeks.
