= Nostos =

Theme in Ancient Greek literature

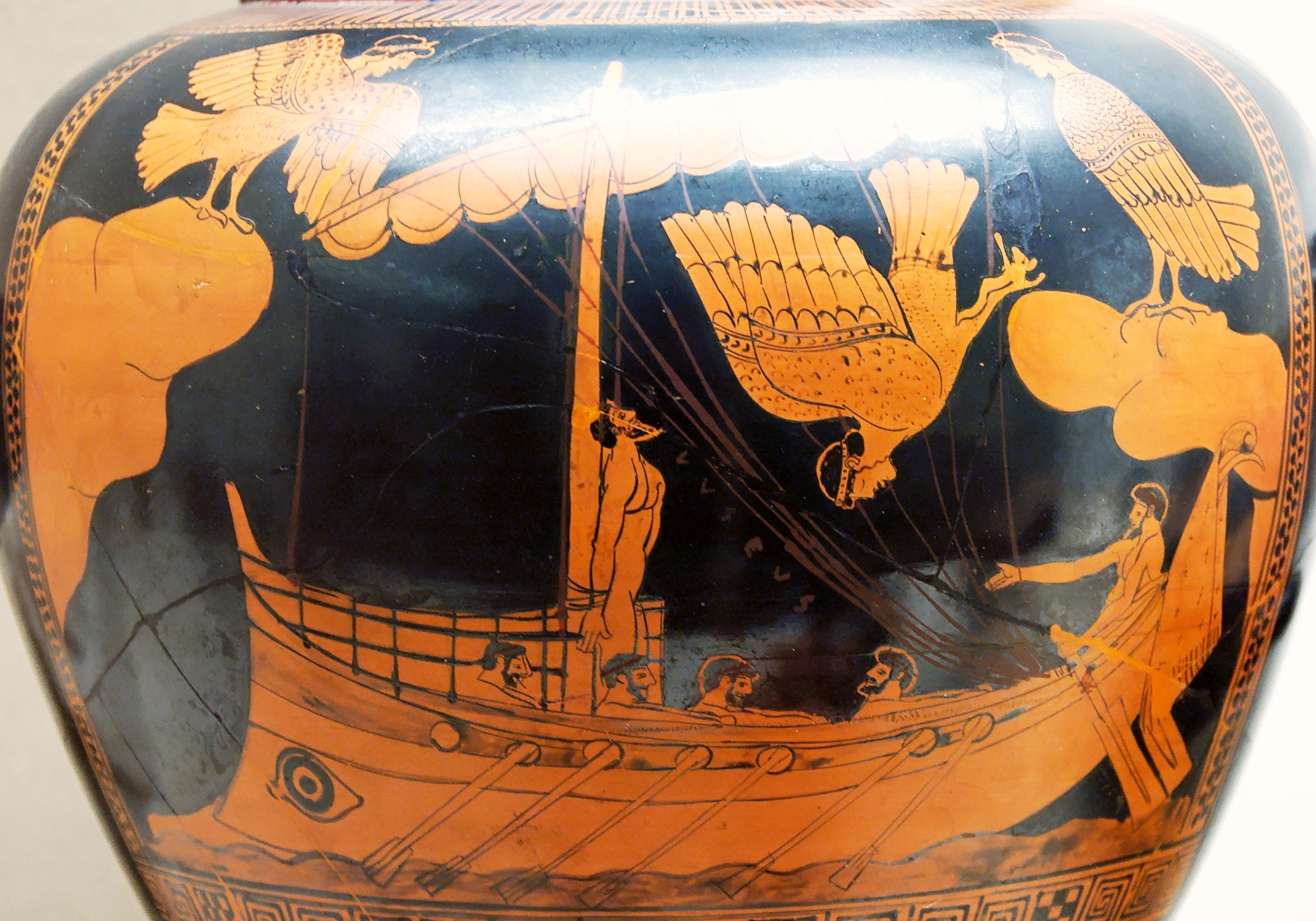
The journey of Odysseus presented in Homer's Odyssey is a quintessential example of nostos in Ancient Greek literature.

Nostos (Ancient Greek: νόστος) is a theme used in Ancient Greek literature, which includes an epic hero returning home, often by sea. In Ancient Greek society, it was deemed a high level of heroism or greatness for those who managed to return. This journey is usually very extensive and includes being shipwrecked in an unknown location and going through certain trials that test the hero. The return is not only about returning home physically, but also focuses on the hero retaining or elevating their identity and status upon arrival. The theme of nostos is most associated with Homer's The Odyssey, where the main hero Odysseus tries to return home after battling in the Trojan War. Odysseus is challenged by many temptations, such as the Sirens and the Lotus-eaters. If Odysseus had given into these temptations it would have meant certain death and thus failing to return home. However, Nostos was also present in other parts of the Epic Cycle and broader Greek literature. Nostos is also used today in many forms of literature and movies.

== Nostos in the Odyssey ==
In the Odyssey, Homer has nostos being the "return home from Troy by sea." Nostos can be told by those who experienced it themselves, or there are simply instances in which it is present. Those who told their adventures on the sea on their journey back home from Troy were Menelaus, Nestor, and Odysseus. Those three recount their adventures to others in the epic. With Menelaus, in Book Four, he tells of his time in Egypt and other irregular stops. He did not stop at just his nostos but he told of Agamemnon's fatal nostos in great detail as well as a small section of Odysseus' journey. Nestor gives more on Menelaus' nostos and his journey home with Odysseus and Menelaus. In Book Three Nestor said "we pondered our long sea-voyage, whether we should sail over the top of rocky Chios by the island Psyros, keeping it on our left hand, or else to pass under Chios, by windy Mimas. We asked the god to give us some portent for a sign, and the god gave us one, and told us to cut across the middle main sea for Euboia, and so most quickly escape the hovering evil." Here Nestor made it evident to the audience that his and Diomedes's journey home was a perfect nostos, they had no real issues, which was quite different from Agamemnon's. This great difference shows how different each hero's journey home could be. In these instances where nostos is simply present and not told by the individual in the Odyssey, there is an intention to reach a specific destination and some other force blowing the characters off course and arrive in unexpected places on their journey to their home.

The Odyssey had several different instances of nostos. In one incident, Odysseus' companion lost their nostos by eating the cattle of Helios and were killed, because they were specifically told not to. Odysseus warned the men when he said "Friends, since there is food and drink stored in the fast ship, let us then keep our hands off the cattle, for fear that something may befall us. These are the cattle and fat sheep of a dreaded god, Helios, who sees all things and listens to all things." At that point Odysseus warned the men of the consequences of eating the cattle, yet they did it anyway. This situation took away their nostos by ending their homeward journey.

Not all Greek heroes experience nostos. Achilles' nostos is unique in the Iliad; this is because he knows himself that he will not have a nostos, creating a greater difference between him and the other heroes, such as Odysseus. Achilles knows that he has two options when it comes to the Trojan War – he can either die in the battle with glory and have a short life, or not participate and live a long yet insignificant life. In the ninth book, he says "my nostos has perished, but my kleos will be unwilting". In this instance, he has chosen the route of glory and says he will not return home because he is destined to die in battle.

=== Nostos and Odysseus ===
Odysseus was able to tell his own story of his nostos since he has survived. Odysseus was able to tell part of his nostos to the Phaeacians, and the length of his journey shows how difficult it can be to achieve nostos. This arrival and telling of his tales is significant, even though he has not reached home. After Odysseus and his companions leave Circe's palace safely his crew members show their happiness by saying "we rejoice for you saved yourself, nourished by Zeus, as much as if we had reached Ithaca," which shows the comparison of escaping to returning home.

Nostos meant several different things in this epic: escaping death, safe landings, returning home from war, and being back home. Each meaning is evident in the hero's return, at which point the idea of escaping death from war remained in his forethought. These meanings all resemble nostos, and when heroes are on their journey back they will be celebrated for having the ultimate kleos upon arrival.

=== Nostos in other parts of the Epic Cycle ===
The theme of nostos in the Odyssey is complemented by the fragments of other parts of the Epic Cycle, with the returns of Agamenmon and Menelaus being once again told in the Nostoi. The Iliad also has scattered mentions of a first sack of Troy by Heracles, after which he is thrown off course by a storm created by Hera and Hypnos, eventually being saved by Zeus and returning home safely to Argos.

== Nostos in Greek Literature ==
Outside the Epic Cycle, the themes of Nostos is important to several pieces of Greek literature. The most obvious of all being the Oresteia, a tragedy play dramatizing the events of Agamemnon's return and death at the hands of Clytemnestra.

The Anabasis, Xenophon's account of the return of the Ten Thousand from Persia, also explores the theme, including direct comparissons to the Odyssey. The themes of Nostos is sometimes at odds with the idea of the Ten Thousand settling as a colony, a desire that never materializes.

The 2nd century Hellenized Greek Lucian of Samosata satirizes the Nostos in his work A True Story, where travellers journey to extremely outlandish places, such as islands with rivers of wine and the Moon. The book intentionally ends abruptly, robbing the reader of seeing the heroes journey home.

== Modern times ==
The word nostalgia was first coined as a medical term in 1688 by Johannes Hofer (1669–1752), a Swiss medical student. It uses the word νόστος along with another Greek root, ἄλγος or algos, meaning pain, to describe the psychological condition of longing for the past.

=== In literature ===
In James Joyce's Ulysses, the final part (episodes 16–18), during which Leopold Bloom returns home, is called the Nostos. Nostos is an important theme for The Hobbit, with hero Bilbo Baggin's leaving his homeland to wage war afar and then journeying back home.

German literature subverts the idea of Nostos with their concept of Heimkehr (homecoming), where the protagonist returns home after journeying away for long periods of time, only to find his homeland irrevocably changed upon arriving. This genre can be seen already in the 19th century with authors such as Heinrich Heine, but it becomes more popular after World War II with Trümmerliteratur, a literary movement depicting German soldiers returning home from war and discovering that their homeland had been transformed into rubble.

=== In movies and TV ===
The 1989 film Nostos: The Return by Franco Piavoli is about Odysseus's homecoming.

In Louise Glück's 1996 poetry collection Meadowlands, one piece is titled "Nostos".

The TV series Star Trek: Voyager, in which the titular spacecraft is stranded 70,000 light-years from Earth and encounters numerous hostile and friendly aliens and strange phenomena on its way home, has been described by classicists as a nostos.

== See also ==
- Hero's journey
- Nostoi
- Homeric scenes with proper names
