= Scaeus =

Scaeus, the Spartan prince

In Greek mythology, Scaeus (Ancient Greek: Σκαῖος means 'on the left hand') was a Spartan prince as one of the 20 Hippocoöntids, children of King Hippocoön, son of Oebalus and the naiad Bateia.

== Family ==
Scaeus was the brother to Dorycleus, Enarophorus, Euteiches, Bucolus, Lycaethus, Tebrus, Eurytus, Hippothous, Hippocorystes, Alcinous, Alcimus, Dorceus, Sebrus, Eumedes, Enaesimus, Alcon and Leucippus.

== Mythology ==
Scaeus, together with his brothers, helped their father usurped the throne of Lacedaemonia and expelled the former king, Tyndareus, the son of Gorgophone and Hipocoön's (half-)brother. Ultimately, the Hippocoöntids and their father were slain by Heracles who also restored Tyndareus as the rightful ruler of the Lacedeamonians. The bad blood between these two parties can be attributed to the following reasons: (1) the refusal of Hippocoön and his family to cleanse the hero after the death of Iphitus when he came to Sparta, (2) Scaeus and his brothers joined King Neleus of Pylos in his war with the Heracles, and (3) for the manslaughter of Oeonus, son of Licymnius and the hero's cousin, who was beaten to death by the Hippocoöntids with their clubs for stoning in self-defense their Molossian dog. For the latter incident, Heracles straightway give them battle as he was very angry but was wounded in the hip-joint and he stealthily retreated. Afterwards, the son of Alcmene made an expedition against Sparta enlisting the aid of King Cepheus of Arcadia and his sons, and succeeded in avenging himself on Hippocoön, and also on Scaeus and his brothers, for their murder of Oeonus.
