= Hippocoon (king of Sparta) =

King of Sparta, son of Oebalus

- Legendary King of Sparta
- Predecessor: Tyndareos(1st reign)
- Successor: Tyndareos (2nd reign)

In Greek mythology, Hippocoön (/hɪˈpɒkoʊˌɒn, -kəˌwɒn/; Ancient Greek: Ἱπποκόων) was a Spartan king.

== Family ==
Hippocoon was the son of the Spartan King Oebalus and Bateia. His brothers (or half-brothers) were Tyndareus and Icarius. Names of Hippocoön's sons include Dorycleus, Scaeus, Enarophorus, Euteiches, Bucolus, Lycaethus, Tebrus, Eurytus, Hippothous, Hippocorystes, Alcinous, Alcimus, Dorceus, Sebrus, Eumedes, Enaesimus, Alcon and Leucippus (the last three were among the Calydonian hunters). Diodorus Siculus states that there were twenty of them, but gives no individual names.

== Mythology ==
When their father died, Tyndareus became king. Hippocoön, with the help of his sons, overthrew him, took the throne and expelled his brothers from the kingdom. Later, Hippocoön refused to cleanse Heracles after the death of Iphitus. Because of that, Heracles became hostile to Hippocoön, killed him and reinstated Tyndareus. All of Hippocoön's sons were also slain by Heracles, as a revenge for the death of the young Oeonus, son of Licymnius, whom they had killed because he had stoned their dog in self-defense. Heracles's allies in the war against Hippocoön were Cepheus of Arcadia and his twenty sons, who all, as well as Heracles's brother Iphicles, died in the battle (according to Diodorus Siculus, three of Cepheus' sons did survive).

Regnal titles
Preceded by Tyndareus (first reign)	King of Sparta ?–?	Succeeded by Tyndareus (second reign)
