= Lycaethus =

Disambiguation page for Greek mythology

Lycaethus (Ancient Greek: Λύκαιθος) is a name that refers to the following figures in Greek mythology:

- Lycaethus, father of Creon, king of Corinth, father of Glauce and Hippotes.
- Lycaethus, a son of King Hippocoon of Sparta, usurper of Tyndareus. He was the brother of Lycon, Alcinous, Dorycleus, Scaeus, Enarophorus, Eurytus, Bucolus, Euteiches, Hippothous, Tebrus, Hippocorystes, Alcimus, Dorceus, Sebrus, Eumedes, Enaesimus, Alcon and Leucippus.
- Lycaethus, one of the Suitors of Penelope who came from Same along with other 22 wooers. He, with the other suitors, was slain by Odysseus with the aid of Eumaeus, Philoetius, and Telemachus.
