= Oebalus (mythology) =

In Greek mythology, Oebalus (/ˈɛbələs/; Ancient Greek: Οἴβαλος, romanized: Oíbalos) may refer to the following characters:

- Oebalus, son of King Cynortes of Sparta and the latter's successor to the throne. By Gorgophone or the nymph Bateia, he was the father of Tyndareus, Arene and many others.
- Oebalus, king of Campania in Italy and son of the Teleboan king Telon of Capraea. He was an ally of Turnus during the latter's conflict with Aeneas and his Trojan men.
- Oebalus, 'swimmer of rough Eurotas', was a Spartan warrior in the army of the Seven Against Thebes during their war with the Theban commanders. He was slain in this conflict at Thebes.
