= Axiopoenos =

Epithet of Greek goddess Athena

Axiopoenos (Ancient Greek: Ἀξιόποινος) was in Greek mythology an epithet of the goddess Athena, that meant "the avenger".

There existed a real temple in Sparta to this aspect of the goddess. The legend of its founding related to Oeonus, a son of the Licymnius who was a friend and companion to the hero Heracles. Heracles had promised Licymnius that his son Oeonus would return safely from his travels with Heracles. However while in Sparta, he was attacked by a dog, which he killed with a stone in self-defense. That dog turned out to have belonged to the sons of Hippocoon, king of Sparta, who murdered Oeonus in revenge.

Heracles burned the body of Oeonus (a folk history for the Greek practice of cremation) and to avenge the boy's death, killed Hippocoon and all twenty of his sons, and afterwards erected the temple of Athena Axiopoenos in Sparta, to celebrate her assistance in his vengeance.
