= Amphidamas =

Set of mythological Greek characters

Amphidamas (/æmˈfɪdəməs/; Ancient Greek: Ἀμφιδάμας, romanized: Amphidámas, lit. 'to tame around' or 'subduing on all sides') was the name of multiple people in Greek mythology:

- Amphidamas, father of Pelagon, king of Phocis, who gave Cadmus the cow that was to guide him to Boeotia.
- Amphidamas or Amphidamantes, father of Clytia who was the possible mother of Pelops and Tantalus' other children.
- Amphidamas or Iphidamas, an Arcadian prince as son of King Aleus and either Neaera or Cleobule. He was one of the Argonauts, along with his brother Cepheus. Amphidamas, was the father of Nausidame who bore Helios a son, Augeas, king of Elis.
- Amphidamas, an Arcadian prince as son of King Lycurgus by either Cleophyle or Eurynome, and thus brother of Ancaeus, Epochus and Iasus. Amphidamas had two children: Melanion, the husband of Atalanta, and Antimache who married King Eurystheus of Tiryns.
- Amphidamas or Iphidamas, son of Busiris, king of Egypt, and possible brother of Melite. He was killed, alongside his father, by Heracles of whom they tried to sacrifice. Some accounts, added the herald Chalbes and the attendants to the list of those slain by the hero.
- Amphidamas, a man from Cythera who was given by Autolycus a helmet to take to Scandea. This cap was previously stolen by the famous thief from the stout-built house of Amyntor, son of Ormenus. Amphidamas gave the item as a guest-gift to Molus who in turn, gave it to his son Meriones to wear. Later on, Odysseus received the helmet from Meriones himself.
- Amphidamas or Amphidamus, a native of Opus and father of Clitonymus, who was killed by Patroclus over a game of dice. In some accounts, the name of the slain man was variously given as Clisonymus or Aeanes.
- Amphidamas, one of the men hidden in the Trojan horse.
- Amphidamas, one of the comrades of the Greek hero Odysseus. When the latter and 12 of his crew came into the port of Sicily, the Cyclops Polyphemus seized and confined them. Along with the Ithacan king and six others namely: Lycaon, Amphialos, Alkimos, Antilochus and Eurylochos, Amphidamas survived the manslaughter of his six companions by the monster.
