= Evandre (mythology) =

In Greek mythology, Evandre (Ancient Greek: Εὐάνδρη, romanized: Euandrē, lit. 'good woman' or 'as good as a man') was one of the Amazons, a race of warrior-women. She came with their queen, Penthesilia to the Trojan War.

== Mythology ==
During the siege of Troy, Evandre was slayed by the Cretan warrior Meriones, son of Molus.

"Then, as Evandre through the murderous fray with Thermodosa rushed, stood Meriones, a lion in the path, and slew: his spear right to the heart of one he drave, and one stabbed with a lightning sword-thrust 'twixt the hips: leapt through the wounds the life, and fled away."
