= Thermodosa =

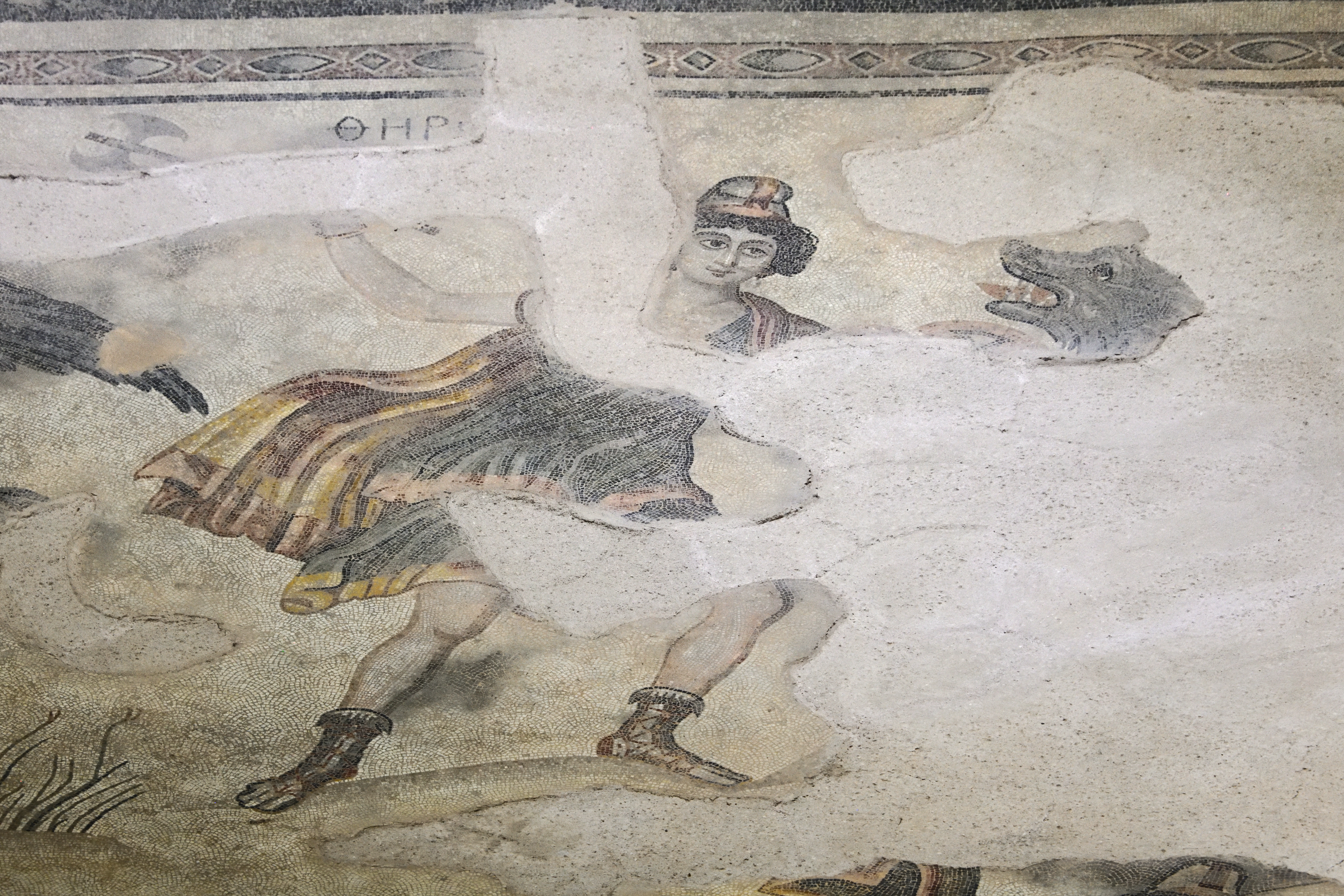
Thermodosa on a late antique mosaic

In Greek mythology, Thermodosa (Ancient Greek: Θερμώδωσα, lit. 'warm gift') was one of the Amazons, a race of warrior-women. She came with their queen, Penthesilia to the Trojan War.

== Mythology ==
During the siege of Troy, Thermodosa was slain by the Cretan warrior Meriones, son of Molus.

"Then, as Evandre through the murderous fray with Thermodosa rushed, stood Meriones, a lion in the path, and slew: his spear right to the heart of one he drave, and one stabbed with a lightning sword-thrust 'twixt the hips: leapt through the wounds the life, and fled away."
