= Deianira (mythology) =

In Greek mythology, Deianira (/ˌdeɪ.əˈnaɪrə/; Ancient Greek: Δηϊάνειρα, Dēiáneira, or Δῃάνειρα, Dēáneira, [dɛːiáneːra]) was the name of three individuals whose name meant as "man-destroyer" or "destroyer of her husband".

- Deïanira, as the daughter of Lycaon (Lycon) son of the giant Aezeius, one of the first kings of the Peloponnesus. She married Pelasgus, son of Niobe and Zeus and, according to some, she became by him mother of the impious Lycaon.
- Deianira, daughter of Oeneus of Calydon and wife of Heracles.
- Deianira, an Amazon killed by Heracles during his quest for the girdle of Hippolyta.
