= Iasus =

Name of several figures in Greek mythology

In Greek mythology, Iasus (/ˈaɪ.ə.səs/; Ancient Greek: Ἴασος) or Iasius (/aɪˈeɪʒəs/; Ἰάσιος) was the name of several people:

- Iasus (Iasius), one of the Dactyli or Curetes.
- Iasus, king of Argos.
- Iasus, son of Io
- Iasius (Iasion), son of Eleuther and brother of Pierus. He was the father of Chaeresilaus and Astreis.
- Iasius, another name of Iasion.
- Iasus (Iasius), the Arcadian father of Atalanta by Clymene, daughter of Minyas; he was the son of King Lycurgus of Arcadia by either Eurynome or Cleophyle. His brothers were Ancaeus, Epochus and Amphidamas.
- Iasus (Iasius), father of King Amphion of Orchomenus. The latter married Persephone, daughter of Minyas, and fathered Chloris and Phylomache who both married the twins, Neleus and Pelias, respectively. This Iasius is likely the same with the above Iasus.
- Iasus, father of Nepeia, who married King Olympus and gave her name to the plain of Nepeia near Cyzicus.
- Iasius, winner of the horse-racing contest at the Olympic games held by Heracles.
- Iasus, father of Phaedimus. His son was killed by Amyntas in the war of the Seven against Thebes.
- Iasus, son of Sphelus (himself son of Bucolus), leader of the Athenians, was killed by Aeneas in the Trojan War.
- Iasus, king of Cyprus, father of Dmetor. In the Odyssey, he appears in a story told (and made up) by Odysseus.
- Iasus, father of Palinurus and Iapis.
