= Epochus =

In Greek mythology, the name Epochus (/ˈɛp.ə.kəs/; Ancient Greek: Ἔποχος) may refer to:

- Epochus, an Arcadian prince as son of King Lycurgus of Arcadia and Cleophyle or Eurynome or Antinoe, and thus the brother of Ancaeus, Amphidamas and Iasus. Epochus participated in the Calydonian boar hunt together with his brother Ancaeus: Pausanias describes a painting in the Tegean temple of Athena Alea, which portrays, among others, Epochus supporting Ancaeus who had been wounded by the boar. Later on, Epochus fell ill and died, and was outlived by their father Lycurgus who reached an extreme old age.
- Epochus, one of the two brothers of Oenoe (the eponym of a deme in Attica) that were portrayed on the altar of Nemesis in Rhamnous.
