= Phaenops =

Greek mythological figures

In Greek mythology, the name Phaenops (Ancient Greek: Φαῖνοψ, romanized: Phaínops, lit. 'bright-eyed') refers to three characters who are all associated with Troy and the Trojan War:

- Phaenops, father of Xanthus and Thoon, who were slain by Diomedes. He was an old man by the time the Trojan War began, and had no other sons and heirs except these two.
- Phaenops, father of Phorcys, from Phrygia.
- Phaenops, son of Asius, son of Hyrtacus and brother of Adamas. He was a resident of Abydus and the best guest-friend of Hector. Apollo, at one point, assumed the form of this Phaenops to appear in front of Hector.
