= Sumatia =

Town of ancient Arcadia

Coordinates: 37°30′36″N 22°17′31″E

Sumatia or Soumatia (Ancient Greek: Σουματία), or Sumetia or Soumetia (Σουμητία), also known as Sumateium or Soumateion (Σουμάτειον), or Sumeteia or Soumeteia (Σουμήτεια), was a town of ancient Arcadia in the district Maenalia, on the southern slope of Mount Maenalus. According to Greek mythology, Sumatia was founded by Sumateus, a son of Lycaon. Pausanias says that Sumatia was one of the towns in the territory of Maenalus, and was one of the towns that united to form Megalopolis.

Its site is located near the modern Silimna.
