= Alcimedon =

Multiple Greek mythological figures

Alcimedon (/alkĭ'mĭdon/; Ancient Greek: Ἀλκιμέδων, romanized: Alkimedon, lit. 'brave ruler' or 'mighty guardian') can refer to a number of people in Greek mythology and history:

- Alcimedon, one of the Tyrrhenian sailors, who wanted to carry off the infant Dionysus from Naxos, but was metamorphosed, with his companions, into a dolphin.
- Alcimedon, an Arcadian hero, from whom the Arcadian plain Alcimedon derived its name. He lived in a place near Mount Ostracina and had a daughter named Phialo, by whom Heracles had a son, Aechmagoras. Alcimedon exposed the latter but Heracles saved him.
- Alcimedon, a son of Laerceus, and one of the commanders of the Myrmidons under Patroclus. He is sometimes conflated with Alcimus, friend of Achilles.
- Alcimedon, a craftsman, mentioned or imagined by the Latin poet Virgil in his Eclogue 3, who had made two pairs of cups, one pair decorated with pictures of Conon of Samos and another astronomer, and the other pair with a picture of Orpheus.
- Alcimedon, a Locrian companion of Ajax the Lesser during the Trojan War. During Eurypylus' attack on the Greek camp, he killed Hippasides, the charioteer of Prince Pammon, son of Priam. Later, as he attempted to climb up the walls of Troy, Aeneas dropped a stone on him, killing Alcimedon.
