= Aphneius =

Aphneius (Ancient Greek: Ἀφνειός) was in Greek mythology an epithet of the god Ares, under which he had a temple on Mount Cnesius, near Tegea in Arcadia. The name signified him as the giver of food or plenty.

Aerope, the daughter of Cepheus, King of Tegea, became by Ares the mother of a son (named Aeropus), but she died at the moment she gave birth to the child, and Ares, wishing to save it, caused the child to derive food from the breast of its dead mother.
