= Myrina (mythology) =

Name of Greek mythological figures

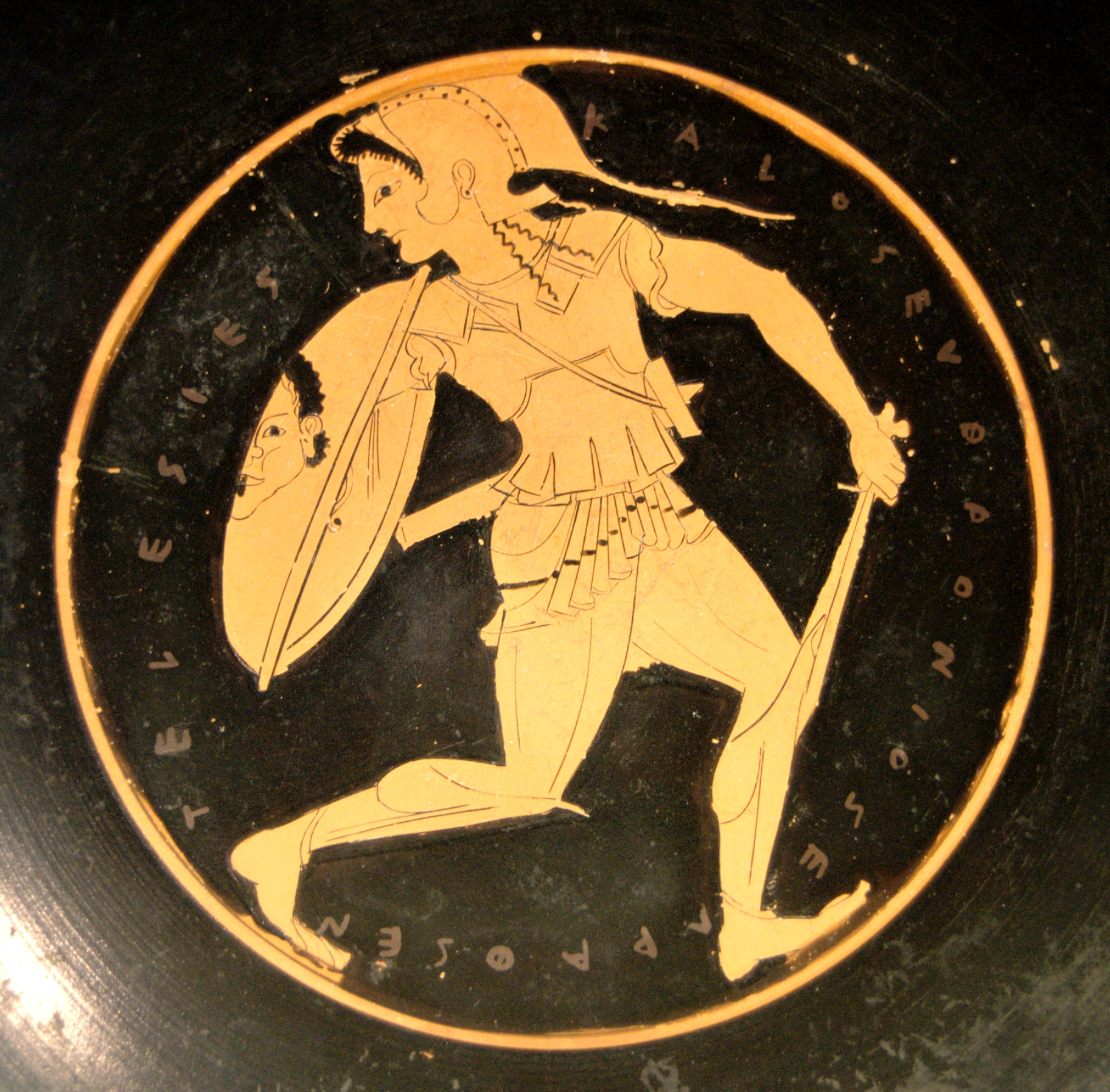
A helmeted Amazon with her sword and a shield bearing the Gorgon head image, Tondo of an Attic red-figure kylix, 510–500 BC, Staatliche Antikensammlungen, Berlin.

In Greek mythology, the name Myrina, Myrinne or Myrinna (Ancient Greek: Μύρινα, Μυρίννη, Μυρίννα) may refer to the following individuals:

- Myrina, queen of the Amazons
- Myrina, daughter of Cretheus and wife of Thoas, another possible eponym for the city of Myrina on Lemnos.
- Myrina, a woman buried in the Troad. In the Iliad, Trojan forces gather by her grave-mound, which was also known as Batea. She was sometimes identified with Myrina the Amazon.
- Myrina, a mythological priestess of Aphrodite who became a myrtle tree.
