= Aezeius =

Greek mythological figure

In Greek mythology, Aezeius (Ancient Greek: Αἰζειός, romanized: Azeios) or Azeus (Άζειόν or Άζειός) was one of the first kings of the Peloponnesus, probably of Arcadia, and a contemporary of Phoroneus who ruled at Argolis.

== Family ==
Azeus was one of the giant sons of Gaea (Earth) and, by a nymph, became the father of the hero Lycaon (Lycon) who also sired Deïanira. The latter became the mother of the younger Lycaon, the impious king of Arcadia, by Pelasgus, the son of Niobê (daughter of Phoroneus) and Zeus.

== Mythology ==
Azeus’ lineage was recounted in the following myth:

". . . I will lift the veil from your remotest ancestry: Chthon (Gaia) teemed of old and bore a son Azeios, who grew to manhood amid the mighty battles of the Titanes. Gigas Azeios encountered a Nymphe with lover's intent, and begot Lykon; and hero Lykon begot a fair maiden Deianeira. Now Pelasgos of old went up the fair couch of Deianeira when she was growing to womanhood; he was the dear son of Zeus Eleutherios (God of Freedom); and from her bed he got Lykaon, shepherd of the land of Arkadia."

The Arcadians were called Aezeians during Aezeius’ reign and this changed into Lycaonians when Lycaon came into power.

== See also ==
- Azaes
