= Asius (mythology) =

Set of mythical characters

In Greek mythology, Asius (Ancient Greek: Ἄσιος, Asios) refers to three people who fought during the Trojan War:

- Asius, son of Hyrtacus, was the leader of the Trojan allies that hailed from, on, or near the Dardanelles. He was a son of Hyrtacus and Arisbe, the latter being first wife of King Priam and daughter of Merops. Asius led the contingent from a cluster of towns on both sides of the Hellespont, including Arisbe, Percote, Abydos and Sestus. This last town was the only one to lie on the European (northern) side of the Dardanelles; the rest were situated on the Asian (southern) side. Asius himself lived in the town of Arisbe, by the river Selleis. Asius had two brothers, named Nisus and Hippocoon, according to Virgil. All three men fought at Troy as allies of King Priam. During the assault on the Achaean wall, Asius was the only soldier not to listen to Hector and Polydamas, and did not dismount from his chariot. Asius was killed by the Cretan king Idomeneus during the assault.
- Asius, a Phrygian leader and son of King Dymas, and brother of Queen Hecuba of Troy. Asius, son of Dymas, belonged to a tribe of Phrygians who lived by the River Sangarius. He had two sons, Adamas and Phaenops. In the Iliad, Apollo is said to have taken Asius's shape to encourage Hector to fight Patroclus. This Asius does not die in the narrative of the Iliad, but Dictys Cretensis says he was killed by Ajax.
- Asius, son of Imbrasus and companion of Aeneas in Italy.
