= Adamas (mythology) =

Figure of greek mythology

In Greek mythology, Adamas (Ancient Greek: Ἀδάμαντα, romanized: Adamantas, lit. 'unconquerable', 'invincible' or 'indestructible') was a participant during the Trojan War. He was the son of Asius, son of Hyrtacus, and brother of Phaenops. Adamas was killed by Meriones.
