= Clysonymus =

Character in Greek mythology

In Greek mythology, Clysonymus (Ancient Greek: Κλυσώνυμος, romanized: Klusṓnumos) was the son of Amphidamas of Opuntus and a childhood friend of Patroclus. Patroclus accidentally killed Clysonymus during an argument over a game of dice, causing Patroclus to be exiled from Opus.
