= Dolon (mythology) =

Ancient Greek mythological figure

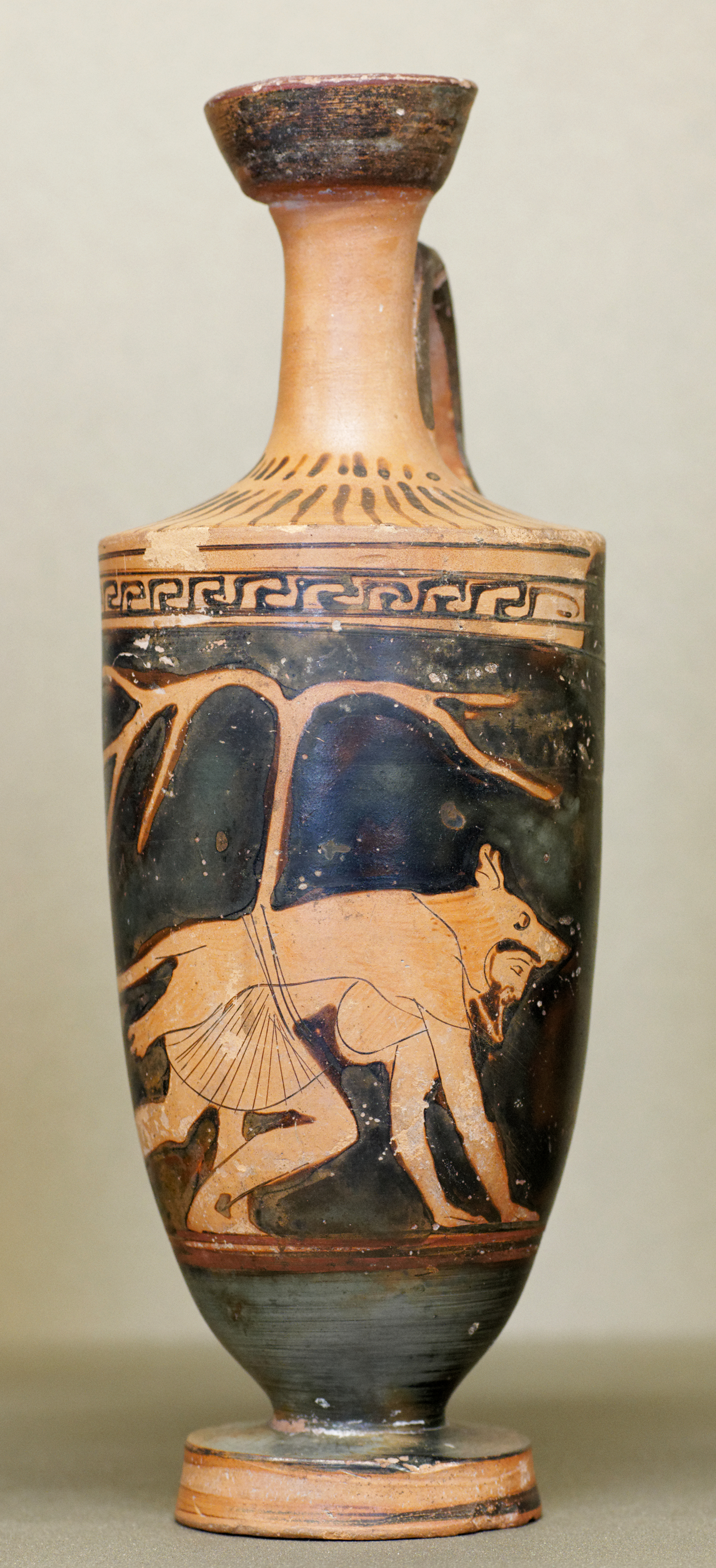
Dolon crawling on all fours in his wolf skin on an Attic red-figure lekythos, Louvre

In Greek mythology, Dolon (Ancient Greek: Δόλων, romanized: Dólōn, lit. 'tricky, deceitful') fought for Troy during the Trojan War. He volunteered to spy on the Greek camp at the request of Hector, but was captured by Diomedes and Odysseus.

== Night mission in Homer's Iliad ==
Dolon was the son of Eumedes and had five sisters. Considered a fast runner, after a request by Hector in which all the Trojan men were called together, Dolon put himself forward to spy on the Greek ships and check whether or not, as well as how, the Greeks were still guarding them. In exchange, Hector offered the horses and bronze chariot of Achilles as his prize at the end of the war. Fearing deceit, Dolon demanded that Hector swore to fulfill the promised reward. Dolon departed, wearing a wolf skin and a marten-pelt cap in order to blend into his surroundings. His plan was to deceive the Greeks by walking on all fours.

By chance, he was spotted by Odysseus and Diomedes while they were on a secret raid to plunder the Trojans. The Greek warriors saw Dolon coming and hid in the bodies of the dead so that Dolon could not see them. Diomedes chased Dolon down with guidance from Athena. Dolon, after torture, begged for his life, telling the two warriors that he was worth a valuable ransom as his father, Eumedes, was very wealthy. Odysseus said that he would not kill Dolon if he told the two of them why he was spying on the Greeks. Dolon told Odysseus everything he needed to know, including his potential prize, before Odysseus explained to him that he had been tricked by Hector; only Achilles had the ability to control the horses that he was to receive. Dolon then informed the two Greeks which Trojan allies were living in which tent and what their strengths were. After this, Odysseus went back on his promise and Dolon was decapitated by Diomedes before the two went into the Trojan camp to wreak havoc, slaying Rhesus, king of Thrace, and stealing his valuable horses. His son Eumedes, named after Dolon's father, survived the Trojan War to later fight and die by the hand of Turnus under the command of Aeneas in Italy.
