= Antilochus (comrade of Odysseus) =

Mythological Greek character

In Greek mythology, Antilochus (/ænˈtɪləkəs/; Ancient Greek: Ἀντίλοχος Antílokhos) was one of the comrades of the Greek hero Odysseus. When the latter and 12 of his crew came into the port of Sicily, the Cyclops Polyphemus seized and confined them. Along with the Ithacan king and six others namely: Lycaon, Amphialos, Alkimos, Amphidamas and Eurylochos, Antilochus survived the manslaughter of his six companions by the monster.
