= Phaedimus (mythology) =

People in Greek mythology

In Greek mythology, Phaedimus (Ancient Greek: Φαίδιμος, romanized: Phaídimos, lit. 'radiant') can refer to one of the following people:

- Phaedimus, one of the numerous Niobids, the sons and daughters of King Amphion and Queen Niobe of Thebes, killed by Apollo when their mother insulted Leto.
- Phaedimus, a king of Sidon, who received Menelaus warmly during his return journey from Troy. He gave Menelaus a cup forged by Hephaestus.
- Phaedimus, a descendant of Pentheus, and one of the fifty Thebans who lay an ambush for Tydeus on his return from Thebes and were killed by him.
- Phaedimus, son of Spartan Iasus, killed by Amyntas during the war of the Seven against Thebes.
- Phaedimus, one of the sacrificial victims of the Minotaur.

== Bibliography ==
- Apollodorus, Apollodorus, The Library, with an English Translation by Sir James George Frazer, F.B.A., F.R.S. in 2 Volumes. Cambridge, MA, Harvard University Press; London, William Heinemann Ltd. 1921. Online version at the Perseus Digital Library.
- Homer; The Odyssey with an English Translation by A.T. Murray, Ph.D. in two volumes. Cambridge, MA., Harvard University Press; London, William Heinemann, Ltd. 1919. Online version at the Perseus Digital Library.
- Ovid. Metamorphoses, Volume I: Books 1-8. Translated by Frank Justus Miller. Revised by G. P. Goold. Loeb Classical Library No. 42. Cambridge, Massachusetts: Harvard University Press, 1977, first published 1916. ISBN 978-0-674-99046-3. Online version at Harvard University Press.
- Statius, Thebaid volumes I–IV, in Statius, translated by Mozley, J H. Loeb Classical Library Volumes. Cambridge, Massachusetts, Harvard University Press; London, William Heinemann Ltd. 1928. Archive.
- Statius, Thebaid volumes V–, translated by Mozley, J H. Loeb Classical Library Volumes. Cambridge, Massachusetts, Harvard University Press; London, William Heinemann Ltd. 1928. Archive.
- Strabo, The Geography of Strabo, translated into English with notes. London. George Bell & Sons. 1903. Online version at the Perseus Digital Library.
