= Harmon (mythology) =

Ancient Greek male name

In Greek mythology, Harmon (Ancient Greek: Ἁρμων, romanized: Harmōn) may refer to two distinct figures:

- Harmon, father of Tecton, father of Phereclus, the shipwright who constructed the ship with which Paris abducted Helen.
- Harmon, one of the 12 Trojan warriors slain by Neoptolemus using his father's (i.e. Achilles) spear.
