= Eurypylus (son of Poseidon) =

Greek mythological figure

In Greek mythology, Eurypylus (/jʊəˈrɪpɪləs/; Ancient Greek: Εὐρύπυλος, romanized: Eurupulos) was a son of Poseidon and the Pleiad Celaeno. According to a scholium on the Argonautica he was a king of Cyrene and the brother of Eupemus and Lycus, who were also referred to as Eurytus and Lycaon. Eurypylus married Sterope, a daughter of Helios and had two sons, Lycaon and Leucippus. Triton assumed his shape when he encountered the Argonauts in Libya. This Eurypylus must not be confused with another son of Poseidon named Eurypylus, king of Cos.
