= Alcimedonte =

Mythological figure in Greek mythology

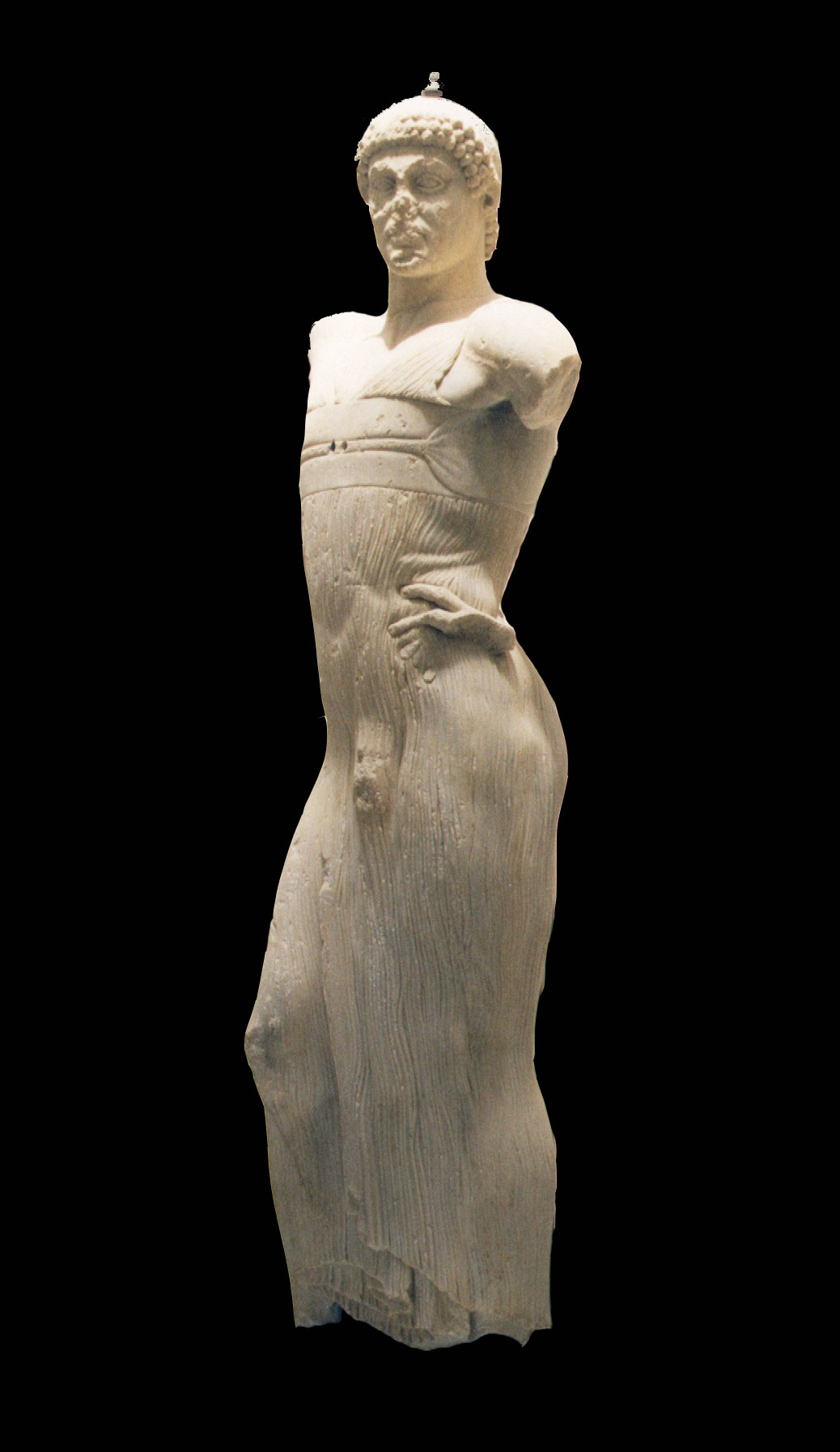
Auriga of Motya (Alcimedonte), Greek work of the 5th century BC

Alcimedonte or Alcimedon (Greek: Ἀλκιμέδων) is a character from Greek mythology.

He was the son of Laerces and one of the five leaders of the Myrmidons in the contingent led by Achilles during the Trojan War, mentioned by Homer in the Iliad, Books XVI and XVII.

When the combat to the death between Patroclus, who was wearing Achilles' armor, and Hector ended with Hector's victory, Alcimedonte took over Achilles' chariot, drawn by the immortal horses Xanthus and Balius, as he was described as an excellent charioteer. He drove Achilles' chariot in place of Automedon, allowing Automedon to fight on foot during the fierce battle for Patroclus's body. To protect himself, Automedon asked him to keep the horses close, guarding his back.

According to Pausanias, after the events of the Iliad, Alcimedonte was fatally wounded by Aeneas during one of the battles beneath the walls of Troy.

Alcimedonte was said to have had a daughter, Phialo, who had a romantic affair with Heracles. Her father opposed the union so strongly that he exposed Phialo and her daughter, Ecmagoras (born from Heracles), on a mountain to die. Heracles later rescued them.

The archaeologist Lorenzo Nigro identified Alcimedonte with the Ephebe of Motya, a Greek sculpture from the 1 found in Motya, a small Sicilian island and ancient Phoenician settlement.
