= Antinoe =

In Greek mythology, the name Antinoe (/ænˈtɪnoʊ.iː/; Ancient Greek: Ἀντινόη) may refer to:

- Antinoe, mother of Ancaeus and Epochus by King Lycurgus of Arcadia. The latter's wife was otherwise known as Cleophyle or Eurynome.
- Antinoe, daughter of King Cepheus of Tegea. Instructed by an oracle, she removed the inhabitants of Mantinea from the old settlement founded by Mantineus, son of Lycaon, to a new one. She was guided to the new site by a snake, and from that circumstance the river on the banks of which the new city was founded received the name Ophis (Greek for "snake"). The tomb of Antinoe, known as "The Common Hearth", was shown in Mantinea.
- Antinoe, daughter of Pelias, King of Iolcus. She was a sister of Asteropeia. After the sisters had been tricked by Medea into killing their own father, they had to flee from Iolcus to Arcadia, where they ended their days and were buried.
