= Lycaon (mythology) =

Set of mythological Greek characters

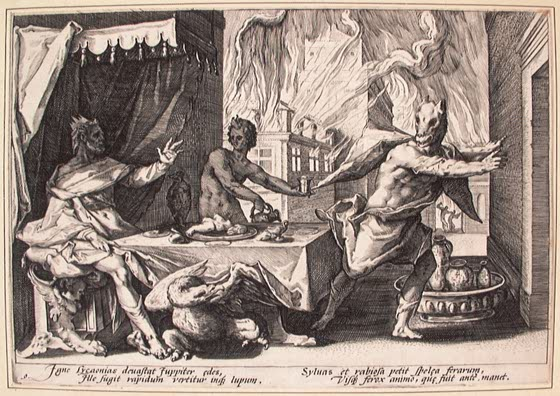
Lycaon. From Ovid's Metamorphoses Book I, 209 ff.

In Greek mythology, Lycaon (/laɪˈkeɪɒn/; Ancient Greek: Λυκάων) may refer to:

- Lycaon or Lycon, an Arcadian hero and prince as son of the giant Aezeius, one of the first Peloponnesian kings, by a nymph. He was the father of Deianira, mother of the impious Lycaon below.
- Lycaon, king of Arcadia and son of Pelasgus. He tried to feed Zeus human flesh; in some myths he is turned into a wolf as a result.
- Lycaon, son of Ares and possibly Pelopia or Pyrene, and thus, the brother of Cycnus. Like his brother, he was also killed by Heracles in one of his adventures.
- Lycaon, also called Lycus, son of Poseidon and Celaeno, one of the Pleiades. He was the brother of King Eurypylus of Cyrene.
- Lycaon, son of the above Eurypylus and Sterope, daughter of Helios, and thus, brother of Leucippus.
- Lycaon, a Trojan prince and son of Priam and Laothoe. He lent his cuirass to Paris when he duelled against Menelaus. On another occasion Apollo took the shape of Lycaon to address Aeneas. During the third year of the war, Lycaon was captured and eventually killed by Achilles.
- Lycaon, one of the comrades of the Greek hero Odysseus. When the latter and 12 of his crew came into the port of Sicily, the Cyclops Polyphemus seized and confined them. Along with the Ithacan king and six others namely: Amphialos, Alkimos, Amphidamas, Antilochus and Eurylochos, Lycaon survived the manslaughter of his six companions by the monster.
- Lycaon, father of Pandarus and Eurytion, a companion of Aeneas in Italy. He was a resident of Zeleia in Lycia.
- Lycaon of Gnossos, one who fashioned the sword that Ascanius, son of Aeneas, gave to Euryalus.
- Lycaon, father of Erichaetes, one of the soldiers of Aeneas in Italy.
