= Cleophyle (mythology) =

Mythologicla wife of Lycurgus of Arcadia

In Greek mythology, Cleophyle (Ancient Greek: Κλεοφύλη, romanized: Kleophúlē) was an Arcadian queen as wife of King Lycurgus, son of Aleus and Neaera. She was the mother of his four sons: Ancaeus, Epochus, Amphidamas, and Iasius. Otherwise, the name of Lycurgus' wife was called Eurynome or Antinoe.
