= Aerope (daughter of Cepheus) =

Mythological character

In Greek mythology, Aerope (Ancient Greek: Ἀερόπη) was a daughter of Cepheus of Arcadia, who was king of Tegea. She had a son (Aeropus?) by Ares, but herself died in labor. The child survived by sucking its dead mother's breasts, which Ares had caused to still produce an abundance of milk. Because of this, Ares was called Aphneius ("Abundant"), and was honored under that name with a sanctuary on Mount Cresius. Pausanias goes on to report that the hill was said to have been given the name Aeropus.
