= Eurynome =

Name in Greek mythology

Eurynomê (/jʊəˈrɪnəmi/; Ancient Greek: Εὐρυνόμη, from εὐρύς, eurys, "broad" and νομός, nomos, "pasture" or νόμος "law") is a name that refers to the following characters in Greek mythology:

- Eurynome, pre-Olympian queen and wife of Ophion
- Eurynome, mother of the Charites.
- Eurynome, one of the Cadmiades, the six daughters of Cadmus and Harmonia in a rare version of the myth. Her sisters were Ino, Agaue, Semele, Kleantho and Eurydike.
- Eurynome or Eurymede, daughter of King Nisus of Megara and mother of Bellerophon by Poseidon or Glaucus.
- Eurynome, mother by the Persian Orchamus of Leucothoe whom Helios loved.
- Eurynome, wife of Lycurgus of Arcadia and mother of Amphidamas, Epochus, Ancaeus, and Iasus. Elsewhere is also called Cleophyle or Antinoe.
- Eurynome, daughter of Iphitus and mother of Adrastus of Argos by Talaus. In some accounts, she was called the daughter of Apollo.
- Eurynome, waiting woman of Penelope in the Odyssey.
- Eurynome, a handmaiden of Harmonia.
- Eurynome, a Lemnian woman. The goddess Pheme paid a visit to her in the guise of her friend Neaera to inform her that Eurynome's husband Codrus was being unfaithful to her with a Thracian woman.
- Eurynome, an alternate name for Eidothea, the daughter of Proteus.
- Eurynome, the wife of Asopus and mother of Ogygias by Zeus, according to a late source.

== See also ==
- Eurynomos
