= Tecton (mythology) =

Ancient Greek male name

In Greek mythology, Tecton (Ancient Greek: Τέκτων, romanized: Tektōn, lit. 'artisan', 'craftsman', 'builder' or 'woodworker') may refer to two distinct characters:

- Tecton, son of Harmon and father of Phereclus, one of the Trojans.
- Tecton, one of the Phaeacians and father of Polyneus, the father of Amphialus.
