= Lycurgus of Arcadia =

King of Tegea in Greek mythology

In Greek mythology, Lycurgus (Ancient Greek: Λυκοῦργος, romanized: Lykoûrgos), also Lykurgos, was a king of Tegea in Arcadia.

== Family ==
Lycurgus was the son of Aleus, the previous ruler of Tegea, and Neaera, daughter of Pereus, and thus, brother to the Argonauts Amphidamas, Cepheus, Auge and Alcidice. He married either Cleophyle, Eurynome or Antinoe and fathered these sons: Ancaeus, Epochus, Amphidamas, and Iasius.

== Mythology ==
Lycurgus was notorious for killing, by ambushing him, a warrior called Areithous. He attacked the man unexpectedly in a narrow passage where Areithous' famous club was useless. Lycurgus took Areithous' armor as spoils and wore it himself, but handed it over to Ereuthalion when he had grown old. According to scholia on the Argonautica, Ereuthalion was also vanquished by Lycurgus, who laid an ambush against him and overcame him in the ensuing battle. The Arcadians celebrated a feast known as Moleia in commemoration of this mythical event (mōlos being a word for "battle" according to the scholiast), and paid general honors to Lycurgus.

Lycurgus outlived his sons and reached an extreme old age for Epochus fell ill and died while Ancaeus was wounded by the Calydonian boar. On his death, he was succeeded by Echemus, son of Aeropus, the whom would have been either son of his brother Cepheus and hence a scion of Arkas, or of one Phegeus of entirely different descent
