= Phereclus =

Mythical person of the Trojan War

In Greek mythology, Phereclus or Phereclos (Ancient Greek: Φέρεκλος, romanized: Phéreklos, lit. 'bringing glory' or 'bearer of fame') was a Trojan shipbuilder who constructed the boat that Paris used to kidnap Helen triggering the Trojan War. He was the son of Tecton, son of Harmon.

== Mythology ==
During the Trojan War, Phereklos was slain by Meriones after ramming a spear into his right buttock, piercing his bladder. He was a target because he built Paris' ships and could make other contraptions of war.

In the Iliad, Homer vividly illustrates Phereclus' death in book five:

Meriones then killed Phereclus, son of Tecton,
Harmon's son, whose hands could make fine objects of all sorts.
Pallas Athena had a special love for him.
He was the one who'd made well-balanced ships
for Paris at the start of all the trouble,
bringing disaster on the Trojans and on Paris, too,
for he was ignorant of what gods had decreed.
Meriones went after Phereclus as he ran off,
hurled his spear straight into his right buttock.
The spear point pushed on through, below the bone,
piercing his bladder. He fell down on his knees,
screaming. Then death carried him into its shadows.

== Namesake ==
- 2357 Phereclos, Jovian asteroid named after Phereclus
