= Amphialus =

Set of characters in Greek mythology

In Greek mythology, Amphialus or Amphialos (Ancient Greek: Άμφίαλος, lit. 'of two seas', 'surrounded by the sea' or 'sea-girt') may refer to:

- Amphialus, son of Neoptolemus and Andromache.
- Amphialus, a man in the crew of Menelaus during his return from Troy.
- Amphialos, one of the comrades of the Greek hero Odysseus. When the latter and 12 of his crew came into the port of Sicily, the Cyclops Polyphemus seized and confined them. Along with the Ithacan king and six others namely: Lycaon, Alkimos, Amphidamas, Antilochus and Eurylochos, Amphialos survived the manslaughter of his six companions by the monster.
- Amphialus, a young Phaeacian nobleman and son of Polyneus, son of Tecton. He competed in the games arranged to honour Odysseus.
- Amphialus, one of the Suitors of Penelope from Ithaca along with 11 other wooers. He, with the other suitors, was slain by Odysseus with the aid of Eumaeus, Philoetius, and Telemachus.
