= Sterope of Tegea =

Character in Greek mythology

In Greek mythology, Sterope (/ˈstɛrəpi/; Ancient Greek: Στερόπη, from στεροπή, steropē, lightning) was a daughter of Cepheus, king of Tegea in Arcadia. She received from Heracles a lock of the Gorgon Medusa's hair to help her protect her hometown, Tegea from attack thus the hero won Cepheus' friendship.
