= Oebalus (Aeneid) =

In classical mythology, Oebalus (/ˈɛbələs/; Ancient Greek: Οἴβαλος, romanized: Oíbalos) was a king of Campania who allied his forces with Turnus against Aeneas and the Trojans in Italy.

== Family ==
Oebalus was the Teleboan son of King Telon of Capreae by the river nymph Sebethis of the river Sebethus near Naples.

== Mythology ==
Oebalus' father Telon was a ruler of the Teleboans who later immigrated from Taphos to Capreae in Italy. Oebalus was discontented with his native kingdom and left Capri, crossed over to the Italian mainland, and conquered Campania and the tribes living along the Sarnus (Sarno) river.

❝Nor shalt thou, Oebalus, depart unsung,
whom minstrels say the nymph Sebethis bore
to Telon, who in Capri was a king
when old and gray; but that disdaining son
quitted so small a seat, and conquering sway
among Sarrastian folk and those wide plains
watered by Sarnus' wave, became a king
over Celenna, Rufrae, Batulum,
and where among her apple-orchards rise
Abella's walls. All these, as Teutons use,
hurl a light javelin; for helm they wear
stripped cork-tree bark; the crescent of their shields
is gleaming bronze, and gleaming bronze the sword.❞

— Virgil, Aeneid 7.733 – 743
