= Myrina (Amazon) =

Queen of Amazons in Greek mythology

Myrina (Ancient Greek: Μύρινα) was a queen of the Amazons in Greek mythology.

== Family ==
Myrina is sometimes equated with Bateia, the daughter of Teucer. In this case, she was wife to Dardanus and became an ancestor of the Trojan royal line.

== Life ==
According to Diodorus Siculus, Myrina led a military expedition in Libya and won a victory over the people known as the Atlantians, destroying their city Cerne. She was less successful fighting the Gorgons – described by Diodorus as a warlike nation residing in close proximity to the Atlantians – failing to burn down their forests.

During a later campaign, she struck a peace treaty with Horus, ruler of Egypt, and conquered several peoples, including the Syrians, the Arabians, and the Cilicians. Myrina granted freedom to those of the latter who gave in to her of their own will. She also took possession of Greater Phrygia, from the Taurus Mountains to the Caicus River, and several Aegean islands, including Lesbos. She was also said to be the first to land on the previously uninhabited island which she named Samothrace, building the temple there.

The cities of Myrina in Lemnos, possibly another Myrina in Mysia, Mytilene, Cyme, Pitane, and Priene were believed to have been founded by her. They were named after herself, her sister Mytilene, and the commanders in her army, Cyme, Pitane and Priene, respectively. Myrina's army was eventually defeated by Mopsus the Thracian and Sipylus the Scythian. She, as well as many of her fellow Amazons, fell in the final battle.

Her tomb lies on the Trojan plain. It is called Bateia by mortals but Myrina by the gods.
