= Phialo =

Greek mythical character

Phialo or Phillo (Ancient Greek: Φιαλώ, Φιλλώ, romanized: Phialó, Philló) was one of the lovers of the Greek mythological demigod Heracles. She was the daughter of the Arcadian hero Alcimedon and the mother, by Heracles, of Aechmagoras.

== Story ==
While Heracles was in Arcadia, he visited Mount Ostracina, where he seduced Phialo, daughter of Alcimedon. When she bore a son named Aechmagoras, Alcimedon exposed them both to die of hunger on the mountain. Aechmagoras cried piteously, and a well-intentioned jay flew off to find Heracles, mimicking the sound, and thus drew him to the tree where Phialo sat, gagged and bound by her cruel father. Heracles rescued them, and the child grew to manhood. The neighbouring spring has been called Cissa (from kissa "jay"), ever since.

According to Robert Graves, this story is an anecdotal fancy, supposed to account for the name of the spring, which may have been sacred to a jay-totem clan. Stephen Gosson named one of his books The Ephemerides of Phialo, "ephemerides" here meaning an account similar to the Works and Days of Hesiod, and began his text with a discussion of the sacrifices offered to Heracles.
