= Thrasymedes =

Ancient Greek sculptor

Thrasymedes /ˌθræsɪˈmiːdiz/ of Paros (Greek: Θρασυμήδης ο Παριανός) was an ancient Greek sculptor. Formerly, he was regarded as a pupil of Phidias because he set up in the temple of Asclepius at Epidaurus a seated chryselephantine sculpture of that deity, which was evidently a copy of the Statue of Zeus at Olympia by Phidias. An inscription found at Epidaurus yet proves that the temple and the statue belong to the 4th century BCE.
