= Automedon =

Son of Diores and charioteer of Achilles

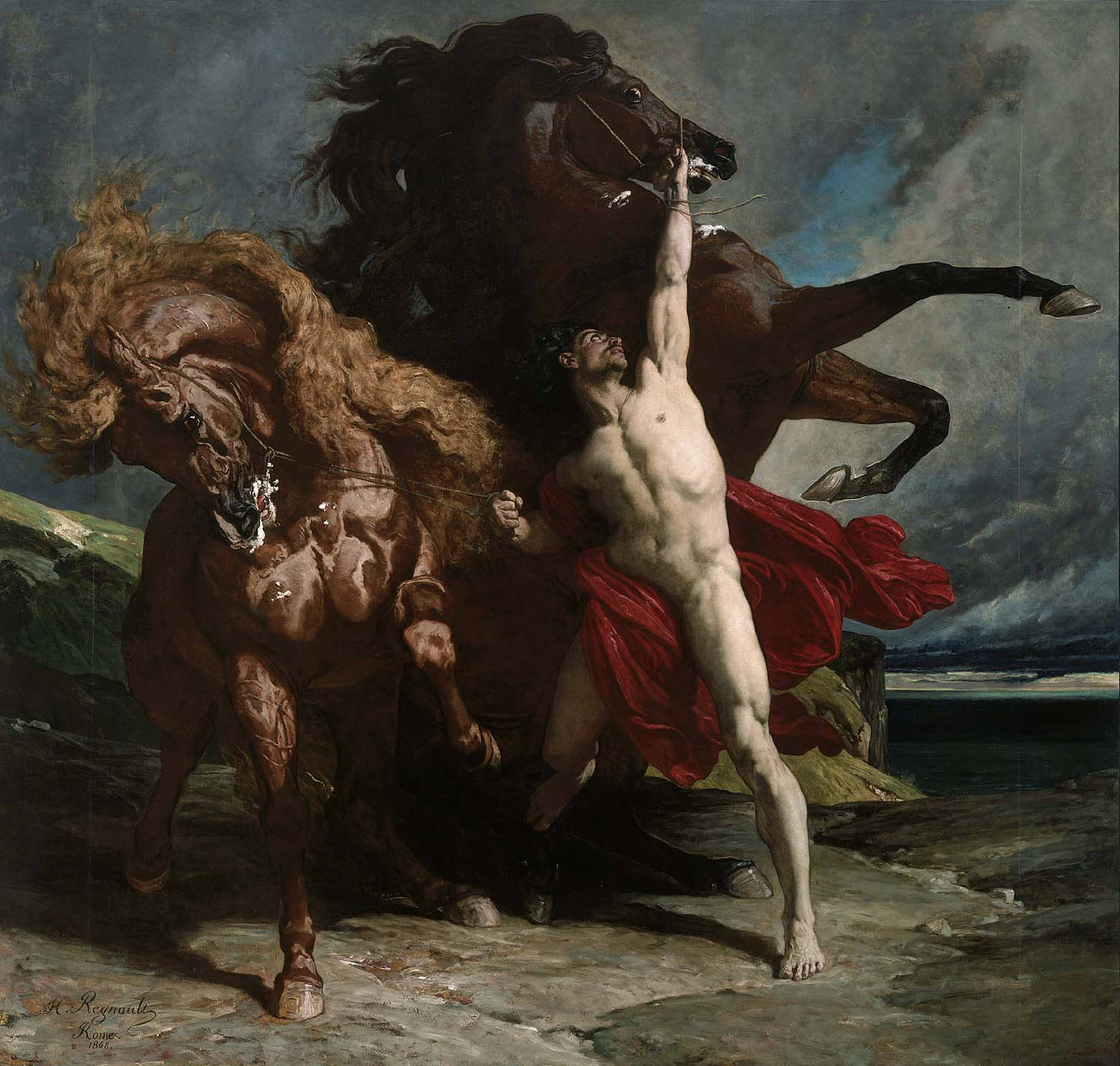
Henri Regnault: Automedon with the Horses of Achilles (1868)

In Greek mythology, Automedon (/ɔːˈtɒmɪdən/; Ancient Greek: Αὐτομέδων), son of Diores, was Achilles' charioteer, who drove the immortal horses Balius and Xanthos. He was from the island of Skyros.

== Mythology ==
In Homer's Iliad, Automedon rides into battle once Patroclus dons Achilles's armor, commanding Achilles' horses Balius and Xanthos. After Patroclus dies, Automedon is driven to the rear of the battle, where he tries to console the bereaved horses.

Zeus finally intervenes, and Automedon resumes driving the chariot, but cannot aid the Achaeans until Alcimedon agrees to be his driver. He repels an attempt on his life by Hector, Aeneas, Chromios, and Aretos, killing Aretos and taking his armor in the process. He also appears in the Aeneid at line 477 of Book II, when the Greek forces break into the palace of Priam.

According to the Fabulae, Automedon came from Scyros and brought ten ships to the Trojan War.
