= Hyrtacus =

Character in Greek mythology

Hyrtacus (/ˈhɜːrtəkəs/; Ancient Greek: Ὕρτακος) is an obscure character associated with the Trojan War in Greek mythology. He was a comrade of King Priam of Troy. Hyrtacus married Arisbe, daughter of King Merops of Percote, after Priam had divorced her to marry Hecabe. Hyrtacus's son by Arisbe was named Asius and fought at Troy. In the Aeneid, Hyrtacus is credited with two more sons, Nisus and Hippocoon. Hyrtacus's own parentage is not given.

The name 'Hyrtacus' is perhaps of Cretan origin, given that there was an ancient city named Hyrtacus (or Hyrtacina) in southwestern Crete.
