= Meriones (mythology) =

Son of Molus of Crete in Greek mythology

- Achaean Leader
- Member of the Cretan Royal Family
- Abode: Crete
- Parents: Molus and Melphis or Euippe

Meriones (/məˈraɪəniːz/ mə-RY-ə-neez; Ancient Greek: Μηριόνης, romanized: Mēriónēs) was the Cretan son of Molus and Melphis or Euippe in Greek mythology. Molus was a half-brother of Idomeneus. Like other heroes of mythology, Meriones was said to be a descendant of gods: as a grandson of Deucalion (son of Minos), Meriones had as ancestors Zeus, Europa, Helios, and Pasiphae, the sister of Circe. Meriones inherited from his father the helmet of Amyntor, which Autolycus had stolen, and which he later gave to Odysseus. Meriones killed seven men at Troy.

== Description ==
Meriones was described by the chronicler Malalas in his account of the Chronography as "shortish, wide, white, good beard, big eyes, black hair, curly hair, flat face, bent nose, quick-moving, magnanimous, a warrior". Meanwhile, in the account of Dares the Phrygian, he was illustrated as ". . . auburn-haired, of moderate height, with a well-proportioned body. He was robust, swift, unmerciful, and easily angered."

== Mythology ==
=== Prior to The Iliad ===
Hyginus lists Meriones as one of the suitors of Helen. This would have made him oath-bound to participate in the Trojan War. However other ancient authorities, including the Bibliotheca and Hesiod, do not include him in the list.

=== The Iliad ===
Though not usually numbered among the major characters, Meriones is one of the most powerful characters in Homer's Iliad. He exemplifies the attributes of a hero without the hubris or pride of one (see below). Meriones is mentioned in Books II, IV, V, VII, VIII, IX, X, XIII, XIV, XV, XVI, XVII. He is recorded to have killed Phereclus the son of Tecton (Book V), Adamas the son of Asius (Book XIII), Harpalion son of King Pylaemenes (Book XIII), Morys (Book XIV), Hippotion (Book XIV), Acamas (Book XVI), Laogonus son of Onetor (Book XVI), and wounded Deiphobus son of Priam (Book XIII).

==== Book II ====
The first reference to Meriones in the Iliad is in the Catalog of Ships in Book II. There he is listed alongside Idomeneus as one of the leaders of the eighty ships from Crete. He is described here and in Books VIII and XIII as a "peer of murderous Ares".

==== Book VII ====
Meriones is among those who volunteered to fight Hector in single combat. The others were Agamemnon, Diomedes, Telamonian Ajax, Ajax the Lesser, Idomeneus, Eurypylus (son of Euaemon), Thoas, and Odysseus. Lots were cast to determine who among these would fight and Telamonian Ajax was chosen.

==== Books IX and X ====
Meriones, along with Nestor's son Thrasymedes, were charged to serve as sentinels for the Achaean army during a period of Trojan advance. Later that night, Nestor called for a volunteer spy among the captains and Diomedes stepped forward. A volunteer was then requested to join Diomedes and Meriones was among the volunteers. The two Ajaxes, Thrasymedes, Menelaus, and Odysseus also volunteered. Diomedes chose Odysseus. As Odysseus was inadequately armed, Meriones acquired a bow and arrows for him and gave him the helm of Amyntor.

==== Book XIII ====
After casting his spear at Deiphobus, but failing to pierce his shield, Meriones returned to his tent to get a new spear. He met Idomeneus there:

"Meriones, fleet son of Molus, best of comrades, why have you left the field? Are you wounded, and is the point of the weapon hurting you? or have you been sent to fetch me? I want no fetching; I had far rather fight than stay in my tent."

"Idomeneus," answered Meriones, "I come for a spear, if I can find one in my tent; I have broken the one I had, in throwing it at the shield of Deiphobus."

And Idomeneus captain of the Cretans answered, "You will find one spear, or twenty if you so please, standing up against the end wall of my tent. I have taken them from Trojans whom I have killed, for I am not one to keep my enemy at arm's length; therefore I have spears, bossed shields, helmets, and burnished corslets."

Then Meriones said, "I too in my tent and at my ship have spoils taken from the Trojans, but they are not at hand. I have been at all times valorous, and wherever there has been hard fighting have held my own among the foremost. There may be those among the Achaeans who do not know how I fight, but you know it well enough yourself."

Idomeneus answered, "I know you for a brave man: you need not tell me. If the best men at the ships were being chosen to go on an ambush- and there is nothing like this for showing what a man is made of; it comes out then who is cowardly and who brave; the coward will change colour at every touch and turn; he is full of fears, and keeps shifting his weight first on one knee and then on the other; his heart beats fast as he thinks of death, and one can hear the chattering of his teeth; whereas the brave man will not change colour nor be on finding himself in ambush, but is all the time longing to go into action- if the best men were being chosen for such a service, no one could make light of your courage nor feats of arms. If you were struck by a dart or smitten in close combat, it would not be from behind, in your neck nor back, but the weapon would hit you in the chest or belly as you were pressing forward to a place in the front ranks. But let us no longer stay here talking like children, lest we be ill spoken of; go, fetch your spear from the tent at once."

Meriones grabbed a bronze spear and followed Idomeneus:

On this Meriones, peer of Mars, went to the tent and got himself a spear of bronze. He then followed after Idomeneus, big with great deeds of valour. As when baneful Mars sallies forth to battle, and his son Panic so strong and dauntless goes with him, to strike terror even into the heart of a hero- the pair have gone from Thrace to arm themselves among the Ephyri or the brave Phlegyans, but they will not listen to both the contending hosts, and will give victory to one side or to the other- even so did Meriones and Idomeneus, captains of men, go out to battle clad in their bronze armour.

The two then went to reinforce the left flank where they perceived the Achaeans to be weakest, Meriones leading the way. The two battled against the Trojans, particularly Deiphobus and Aeneas. In retaliation for the death of Ascalaphus, Meriones pierced Deiphobus in the shoulder with his spear. Gravely injured, Deiphobus was carried from the battlefield by his brother Polites. Meriones then killed Adamas son of Asius and Harpalion son of King Pylaemenes.

==== Books XVII and XXIII ====
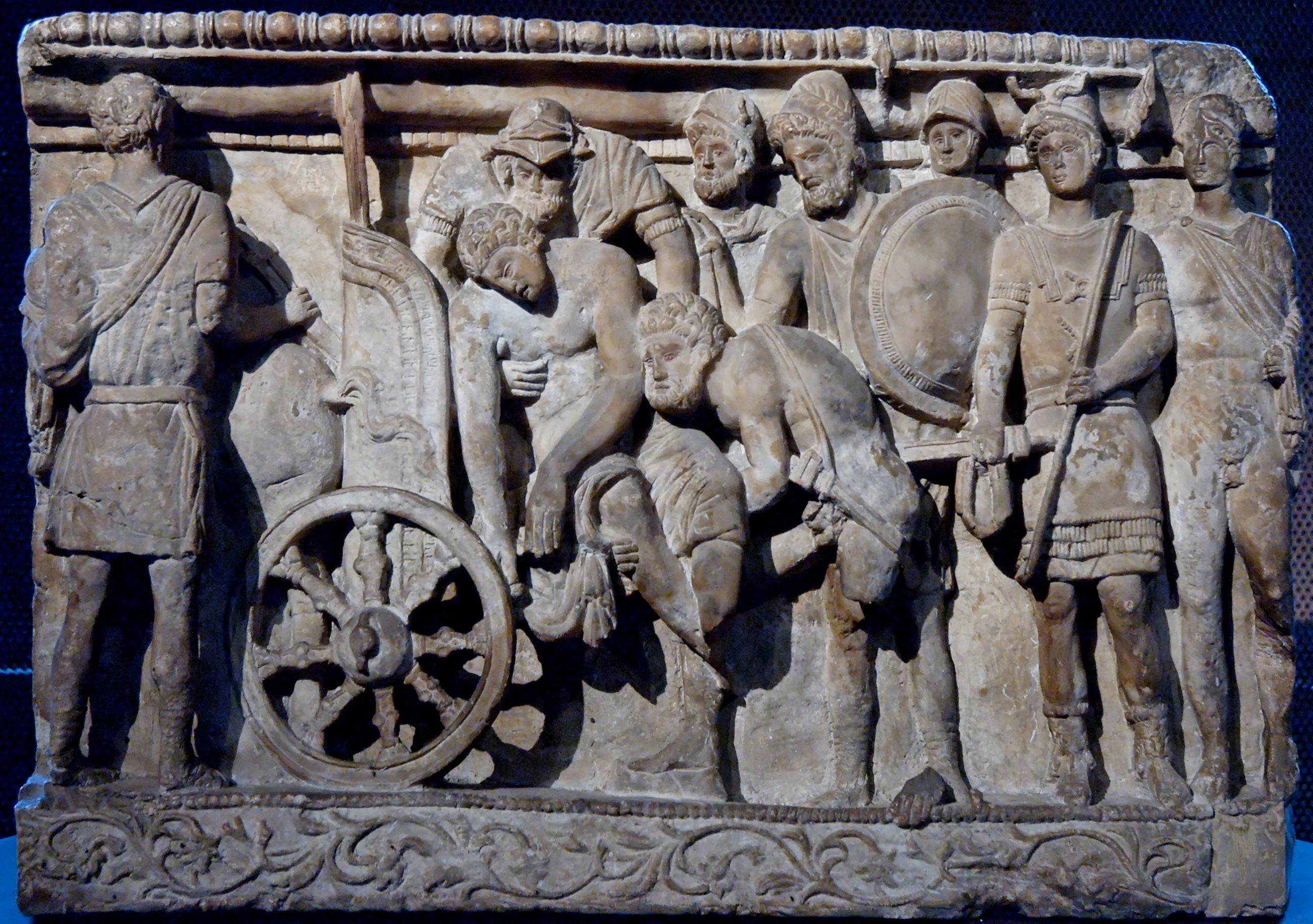
Menelaus and Meriones lift the body of Patroclus (Etruscan urn, 2nd century BC)

After the death of Patroclus, Menelaus called on Meriones and the two Ajaxes to defend the body while he sought Antilochus to act as a messenger of the news to Achilles. Upon returning, Menelaus and Meriones carried Patroclus's body off the battlefield while the Ajaxes guarded them against further attack.

When the funeral pyre for Patroclus was built, Meriones was given charge over the men sent by Agamemnon to all parts of the camp to get wood. They felled timber and brought it to the place where Achilles would later build the structure.

Meriones competed in chariot racing at the funeral games. At the start he was fourth in line behind Antilochus, Eumelus, and Menelaus. Diomedes was fifth in line. Meriones placed fourth behind Diomedes, Antilochus, and Menelaus. He is described as having the slowest horses and being the worst driver of the lot. His prize was two talents of gold.

Meriones fared considerably better in the archery contest:

Achilles next offered a prize of iron for archery- ten double-edged axes and ten with single eddies: he set up a ship's mast, some way off upon the sands, and with a fine string tied a pigeon to it by the foot; this was what they were to aim at. "Whoever," he said, "can hit the pigeon shall have all the axes and take them away with him; he who hits the string without hitting the bird will have taken a worse aim and shall have the single-edged axes." Then uprose King Teucer, and Meriones the stalwart squire of Idomeneus rose also, They cast lots in a bronze helmet and the lot of Teucer fell first. He let fly with his arrow forthwith, but he did not promise hecatombs of firstling lambs to King Apollo, and missed his bird, for Apollo foiled his aim; but he hit the string with which the bird was tied, near its foot; the arrow cut the string clean through so that it hung down towards the ground, while the bird flew up into the sky, and the Achaeans shouted applause. Meriones, who had his arrow ready while Teucer was aiming, snatched the bow out of his hand, and at once promised that he would sacrifice a hecatomb of firstling lambs to Apollo lord of the bow; then espying the pigeon high up under the clouds, he hit her in the middle of the wing as she was circling upwards; the arrow went clean through the wing and fixed itself in the ground at Meriones' feet, but the bird perched on the ship's mast hanging her head and with all her feathers drooping; the life went out of her, and she fell heavily from the mast. Meriones, therefore, took all ten double-edged axes, while Teucer bore off the single-edged ones to his ships.

Agamemnon and Meriones both stood for the javelin throw competition, but Achilles declared Agamemnon to be the greatest among javelin throwers. He proposed that Agamemnon take the cauldron prize and give Meriones the bronze spear. Agamemnon agreed.

=== Posthomerica ===
Meriones is also a prominent character in Quintus Smyrnaeus's Posthomerica, his epic poem, telling the story of the Trojan War, from the death of Hector to the fall of Troy. In Book 1, Meriones kills the Amazons, Evandre and Thermodosa. In Book 6, with Teucer, Idomeneus, Thoas and Thrasymedes, he comes to the rescue of Agamemnon and Menelaus and kills the Paeonian warrior, Laophoon. in Book 8, Meriones kills Chlemus, the son of Peisenor, and kills Phylodamas with an arrow, and in Book 11 he kills Lycon. In Book 12, Meriones is one of the Greeks to enter Troy inside the Trojan Horse.

=== Lindos Chronicle ===
The Lindos Chronicle describes a dedication attributed to Meriones, who supposedly dedicated a silver quiver, at the temple to Athena at Lindos with the inscription "Meriones the son of Molos, spoils of those from Troy".

== In Gluck's opera ==
Christoph Willibald Gluck gave Meriones a role in his 1765 opera Telemaco, making this character involved in Odysseus's wanderings after the Trojan War (which is not attested in Homer's original Odyssey on which the opera was based).
