= Molus of Crete =

Molus
- Member of the Cretan Royal Family
- Abode: Crete

Genealogy
- Parents: Deucalion or Minos
- Siblings: Deucalion
- Consort: Melphis or Euippe
- Offspring: Meriones

In Greek mythology, Molus (/ˈmoʊləs/; Ancient Greek: Μῶλος or Μόλος, romanized: Mōlos or Mólos, lit. 'toil and moil', 'struggle', or 'fight') was the illegitimate son of Deucalion, son of Minos, king of Crete or of Minos instead.

== Family ==
Molus was the father, by Melphis or Euippe, of Meriones, the charioteer of Idomeneus in the Trojan War.

=== Apollodorus's account ===
To Deucalion were born Idomeneus and Crete and a bastard son Molus.

=== Hyginus's account ===
Meriones, son of Molus and Melphis, from Crete, with 40 ships. [Catalogue of ships for the Trojan War]

== Mythology ==
=== Diodorus Siculus's account ===
Minos's sons, they say, were Deucalion and Molus, and to Deucalion was born Idomeneus and to Molus was born Meriones. These two joined with Agamemnon in the expedition against Ilium with ninety ships, and when they had returned in safety to their fatherland they died and were accorded a notable burial and immortal honours. And the Cretans point out their tomb at Cnosus, which bears the following inscription:
Behold Idomeneus the Cnosian’s tomb, and by his side am I, Meriones, the son of Molus.

=== Death ===
Molus had attempted to violate a nymph but was afterwards found without a head; for at a certain festival in Crete they showed the image of a man without a head, who was called Molus.
