= Lycon (mythology) =

In Greek mythology, Lycon (Ancient Greek: Λύκων or Λυκῶνα Lykon; gen.: Λύκωνος means 'wolf') or Lyco (/ˈlaɪkoʊ/; λύκοι); may refer to the following personages:

- Lycon, the "bold" satyr leader who joined the army of Dionysus in his campaign against India.
- Lycon, an Achaean warrior who participated in the Trojan War. He was slain by the Trojan prince Deiphobus, son of King Priam. The latter slew Lycon with a lance which pierced him close above the groin making his bowels gush out.
- Lyco, a Trojan soldier who fought during the siege of Troy. He was killed by Peneleus, a Boeotian leader. The latter and Lyco rushed together with their spears but had missed the other and they rushed again together with their swords. Then, Lyco let drive upon the horn of the helm with horse-hair crest, and the sword was shattered at the hilt. The Boeotian smote him upon the neck beneath the ear, and all the blade sank in, so that nothing but the skin held fast, and the head hung to one side, and his limbs were loosed.
- Lycon, another Trojan warrior who defended the city of Ilium. He died at the hands of the Cretan leader, Meriones.
