= Cepheus (son of Aleus) =

Mythical character

In Greek mythology, Cepheus (/ˈsiːfiəs, -fjuːs/; Ancient Greek: Κηφεύς Kephéus) was a king of Tegea in Arcadia. He was an Argonaut, and was, along with most of his twenty sons, killed in Heracles's war against Hippocoon, king of Sparta. He was perhaps the same Cepheus who, according to the mythographer Apollodorus, participated in the Calydonian boar hunt.

== Family ==
Cepheus was a member of the Arcadian royal family, the descendants of Pelasgos, the first king of Arcadia. He was usually said to be the son of Aleus, the king of Tegea in Arcadia. According to Apollodorus, Aleus had, by Neaera the daughter of Pereus, a daughter Auge and two sons Cepheus and Lycurgus. While according to the mythographer Hyginus, Cepheus (the Argonaut) was the son of Aleus and Cleobule. A different tradition perhaps made Cepheus a son of Lycurgus rather than Aleus.

In addition, the Argonaut Amphidamas was said to be another brother of Chepheus and son of Aleus, while according to the geographer Pausanias, Aleus had three sons, Lycurgus, Amphidamas and Cepheus, however Apollodorus has Amphidamas as the son of Lycurgus. According to the historian Diodorus Siculus, Aleus also had a daughter named Alcidice.

Cepheus had twenty sons, one of whom was named Aeropus. He also had a daughter Sterope, who figured in the story of Cepheus's participation in the war against Hippocoon. Pausanias also mentions two other daughters of Cepheus, Aerope, who died giving birth to a son of the god Ares, and Antinoe.

== Mythology ==
In his youth, Cepheus joined Jason and the Argonauts in their quest for the Golden Fleece. He was joined by his brother Amphidamas, and their nephew Ancaeus, the son of their brother Lycurgus. He was also perhaps, along with Ancaeus, one of the many heroes who joined Meleager in hunting the Calydonian boar, since according to Apollodorus, "Ancaeus and Cepheus, sons of Lycurgus, from Arcadia" were among those who participated in the hunt.

The hero Heracles sought the help of Cepheus and his twenty sons, in his campaign against Hippocoon, king of Sparta. But, according to Apollodorus, Cepheus did not want to leave his kingdom unprotected, fearful that if he did, the Argives would march against Tegea. So Heracles gave Cepheus's daughter Sterope a lock of Medusa the Gorgon's hair, which Athena had given him, saying that if it was held up three times from the city walls, any enemy advancing on the city would turn in flight. Thus persuaded, Cepheus and his twenty sons joined Heracles's expedition against Hippocoon. According to Apolodorus, Cepheus and all of his twenty sons were killed in battle, while according to the historian Diodorus Siculus all were killed except three of the sons.

The city of Caphyae was believed to have received its name from Cepheus. A Cepheus was said to have brought colonists to the town of Kyrenia in Cyprus.
