= Alcimus (mythology) =

Set of mythological characters

Alcimus or Alkimos (Ancient Greek: Ἄλκιμος) may refer to several figures in Greek mythology:

- Alcimus, a companion of Achilles; he and Automedon were the two most favored by Achilles after Patroclus' death. Possibly the same as the Alcimus killed by Deiphobus. He is sometimes conflated with Alcimedon, a captain of the Myrmidons.
- Alcimus, one of the sons of Hippocoon. He had a heroon in Sparta.
- Alcimus, father of Mentor (Odyssey).
- Alcimus, son of Neleus.
- Alkimos, one of the comrades of the Greek hero Odysseus. When the latter and 12 of his crew came into the port of Sicily, the Cyclops Polyphemus seized and confined them. Along with the Ithacan king and six others namely: Lycaon, Amphialos, Amphidamas, Antilochus and Eurylochos, Alcimus survived the manslaughter of his six companions by the monster.

== See also ==
- 12714 Alkimos, Jovian asteroid
