= Ancaeus (son of Lycurgus) =

Argonaut and Calydonian boar hunter

The fallen warrior on Roman sarcophagi of the Calydonian boar hunt is often identified as Ancaeus. This specimen dates to the 2nd century, and is housed at the Archaeological Museum of Eleusis, Greece.

In Greek mythology, Ancaeus (/ænˈsiːəs/; Ancient Greek: Ἀγκαῖος, romanized: Ankaîos) was both an Argonaut and a participant in the Calydonian Boar hunt, in which he met his end.

== Family ==
Ancaeus was the son of King Lycurgus of Arcadia either by Cleophyle or Eurynome or Antinoe. Ancaeus married Iotis and became the father of Agapenor who led the Arcadian forces during the Trojan War.

== Mythology ==
Ancaeus' arms were ominously hidden at home, but he set forth, dressed in a bearskin and armed only with a labrys (λάβρυς "doubled-bladed axe").
