= Batea (mythology) =

Name in Greek mythology

In Greek mythology, the name Batea or Bateia (/bəˈtiːə/ bə-TEE-ə; Ancient Greek: Βάτεια) refers to the following individuals:

- Batea, daughter of King Teucer of the Troad.
- Batea, a Naiad, who married King Oebalus of Sparta. Their sons were Hippocoon, Tyndareus and Icarius. She also becomes somewhat relevant in Plato's dialogues. Plato implies Batea is her name given by the Gods and Myrina the one called by mortals in Cratylus (dialogue).
