= Bucolus =

Set of mythological Greek characters

In Greek mythology, Bucolus (/ˈbjuːkoʊləs/; Ancient Greek: Βουκόλος means "cow boy" or "herdsman" from βους vous "ox" and κελεύω kelevein "command") is the name of four men:

- Bucolus, son of Hippocoon, king of Sparta.
- Bucolus, the Thespian son of Heracles and Marse, daughter of King Thespius of Thespiae. Bucolus and his 49 half-brothers were born of Thespius' daughters who were impregnated by Heracles in one night, for a week or in the course of 50 days while hunting for the Cithaeronian lion. Later on, the hero sent a message to Thespius to keep seven of these sons and send three of them in Thebes while the remaining forty, joined by Iolaus, were dispatched to the island of Sardinia to found a colony.
- Bucolus, father of Sphelus, and grandfather of Iasus, captain of the Athenians at the Trojan War. Iasus was killed by Aeneas.
- Bucolus, a nickname of Daphnis.
- Bucolus, Tanagran man, son of Colonus and brother to Echemus, Leon and Ochne. He and his brothers killed their cousin Eunostus when Ochne falsely accused him of raping her, and were subsequently banished from the land by their father.

== Namesakes ==
- Saint Bucolus, one of the first Christian bishops of ancient Smyrna, disciple of St John the Theologian.
- Bucolus is a genus of ladybird beetles.
