= Enarephoros =

Mythical son of Hippocoon, Sparta

In Greek mythology, Enarephoros or Enarephorus (Ancient Greek: Ἐναρσφόρος and Ἐναρήφορος) was a son of Hippocoon and a most passionate suitor of Helen, when she was yet quite young. Tyndareus, therefore, entrusted the maiden to the care of Theseus. Enarephorus had a heroon at Sparta.
