= Oebalus =

King in Greek mythology

In Greek mythology, Oebalus, also spelled Oibalus or Oibalius, (/ˈɛbələs/; Ancient Greek: Οἴβαλος, romanized: Oíbalos) was a king of Sparta.

== Family ==
Oibalus was the son of either Cynortas or Argalus. He was the second husband of Princess Gorgophone and thus son-in-law of the hero Perseus. With her or by the Naiad Bateia, Oibalos fathered Tyndareus, Icarius and Hippocoon, as well as a daughter, Arene, who married her half-brother Aphareus. The nymph Pirene and Hyacinth were also called the daughter and son of Oebalius respectively. His grandchildren, the Dioscuri, were usually referred as Oibalids or Oebalidae.

Oebalus was often confused with Gorgophone's first husband, Perieres, son of Aeolus. They were separate people, usually unrelated though Oebalus was sometimes said to be Perieres's son.

Comparative table of Oebalus's family
Relation	Names	Sources							
Relation	Names	Hesiod	Apollodorus		Dictys	Hyginus	Pausanias		Lucian
Parentage	Perieres		✓						
Parentage	Argalus				✓				
Parentage	Cynortas						✓		
Consort	Batia		✓						
Consort	Gorgophone						✓		
Children	Tyndareus	✓	✓		✓	✓			
Children	Hippocoon		✓						
Children	Icarius		✓						
Children	Arene			✓		✓		✓	
Children	Hyacinthus					✓			✓
Children	Pirene							✓	

Regnal titles
Preceded by Cynortas	King of Sparta	Succeeded by Tyndareus (first reign)
