= Eumedes =

Eumedes (Ancient Greek: Εὐμήδης) was a name attributed to seven individuals in Greek mythology.

- Eumedes, father of Acallaris who married Tros, king of Dardania.
- Eumedes, a Calydonian son of Melas. He, along with his brothers, were killed for plotting against Oeneus.
- Eumedes, son of Hippocoon, the king of Sparta. His tomb was located in the city.
- Eumedes, the Thespian son of Heracles and Lyse, daughter of King Thespius of Thespiae. Eumedes and his 49 half-brothers were born of Thespius' daughters who were impregnated by Heracles in one night, for a week or in the course of 50 days while hunting for the Cithaeronian lion. Later on, the hero sent a message to Thespius to keep seven of these sons and send three of them in Thebes while the remaining forty, joined by Iolaus, were dispatched to the island of Sardinia to found a colony.
- Eumedes, priest of Athena. When the Heraclidae invaded, Eumedes was suspected of wishing to betray the Palladium to them. Being afraid, he took the Palladium and took it to be hill called Creion.
- Eumedes (also Eumeles) a famous herald among the Trojans. He was the father of Dolon and of five daughters.
- Eumedes, son of Dolon and a companion of Aeneas. He was killed by Turnus.
