= Licymnius =

Greek mythological character

In Greek mythology, Licymnius (/lɪˈsɪmniəs/; Ancient Greek: Λικύμνιος) was a good friend of Heracles and an illegitimate son of Electryon, King of Tiryns and Mycenae in the Argolid (which makes him half-brother of Alcmene, mother of Heracles). His mother is given as Mideia, a Phrygian woman. One source mentions Alco (Ἀλκώ) as his sister. Licymnios appears in the Iliad (II, 661–663) as an old uncle of Heracles (without other details than that of being a "spawn of Ares - which can be understood figuratively as "warrior")

== Mythology ==
Licymnius was the only one of Electryon's sons to return home after the unsuccessful war against the Taphians and Teleboans. Licymnius married Perimede, daughter of Alcaeus and sister of Amphitryon, and became the father of Melas, Argius and Oeonus. Licymnius accompanied Amphitryon when the latter was expelled from the Argolid and fled to Thebes.

When Heracles was gathering his expedition against Laomedon of Troy, he asked Licymnius' son Argius to accompany him. However, Licymnius was reluctant to send Argius, as his elder son, Oeonus, died accompanying Heracles in his war against Lacedaemon. Licymnius therefore forced Heracles to promise that he would bring Argius home. When Argius died at Troy, Heracles cremated his body so that he could be returned to his father.

According to one story, found in the Iliad, he was accidentally killed in his old age by Heracles' son Tlepolemus, when the latter was beating his servant with a stick and Licymnius ran in between (or else Tlepolemus and Licymnius had a quarrel over a certain matter). Pausanias mentions his tomb in Argos.
