= Alcon (name) =

The name Alcon (/ˈælkɒn/; Ancient Greek: Ἄλκων) or Alco can refer to a number of people from classical history:

- Alcon the Molossian (6th century BC) suitor of Agariste of Sicyon.
- Alcon, a surgeon (vulnerum medicus) at Rome in the reign of Claudius, 41–54, who is said by Pliny to have been banished to Gaul, and to have been fined ten million sestertii. After his return from banishment, he is said to have gained by his practice an equal sum within a few years, which, however, seems so enormous that there must probably be some mistake in the text. A surgeon of the same name, who is mentioned by Martial as a contemporary, may possibly be the same person.
- Alcon, a sculptor mentioned by Pliny. He was the author of a statue of Hercules at Thebes, made of iron, as symbolic of the god's endurance of labor.
