= Oeonus =

In Greek mythology, Oeonus (/iːˈoʊnəs/; Ancient Greek: Οἰωνός) was a son of Licymnius who accompanied Heracles. He was killed in Sparta in Heracles's company. Heracles had promised Licymnius that he would bring back his son, and so, when Oeonus died, Heracles burned his body and took the ashes back to the father. This is supposed to be the origin of the Greek practice of cremation.
