= Hippocoon =

Set of mythological Greek characters

In Greek mythology, the name Hippocoön (/hɪˈpɒkoʊˌɒn, -kəˌwɒn/; Ancient Greek: Ἱπποκόων, Hippokóōn) refers to several characters:

- Hippocoon, in one account, father of Neleus, who is otherwise called son of Cretheus or Poseidon.
- Hippocoon, a Spartan king, father of Enarephoros and brother of Tyndareus from whom Hippocoon seized the kingship, then exiled Tyndareus.
- Hippocoon, the great-grandfather of Amphiaraus. The lineage is as follows: Zeuxippe, daughter of this Hippocoön, married Antiphates and gave birth to Oecles and Amphalces; Oecles, in his turn, married Hypermnestra, daughter of Thespius, and to them were born Iphianeira, Polyboea and Amphiaraus.
- Hippocoon, a Thracian counsellor and a kinsman of Rhesus, who fought at Troy. Awakened by Apollo, he is the first to discover the damage caused by Odysseus and Diomedes in the Thracian camp.
- Hippocoon, in the Aeneid, son of Hyrtacus, one of the participants in the archery contest at Anchises's funeral games. His arrow misses, striking the mast to which the target dove is tied.
