= Tyndareus =

King of Sparta

- King of Sparta
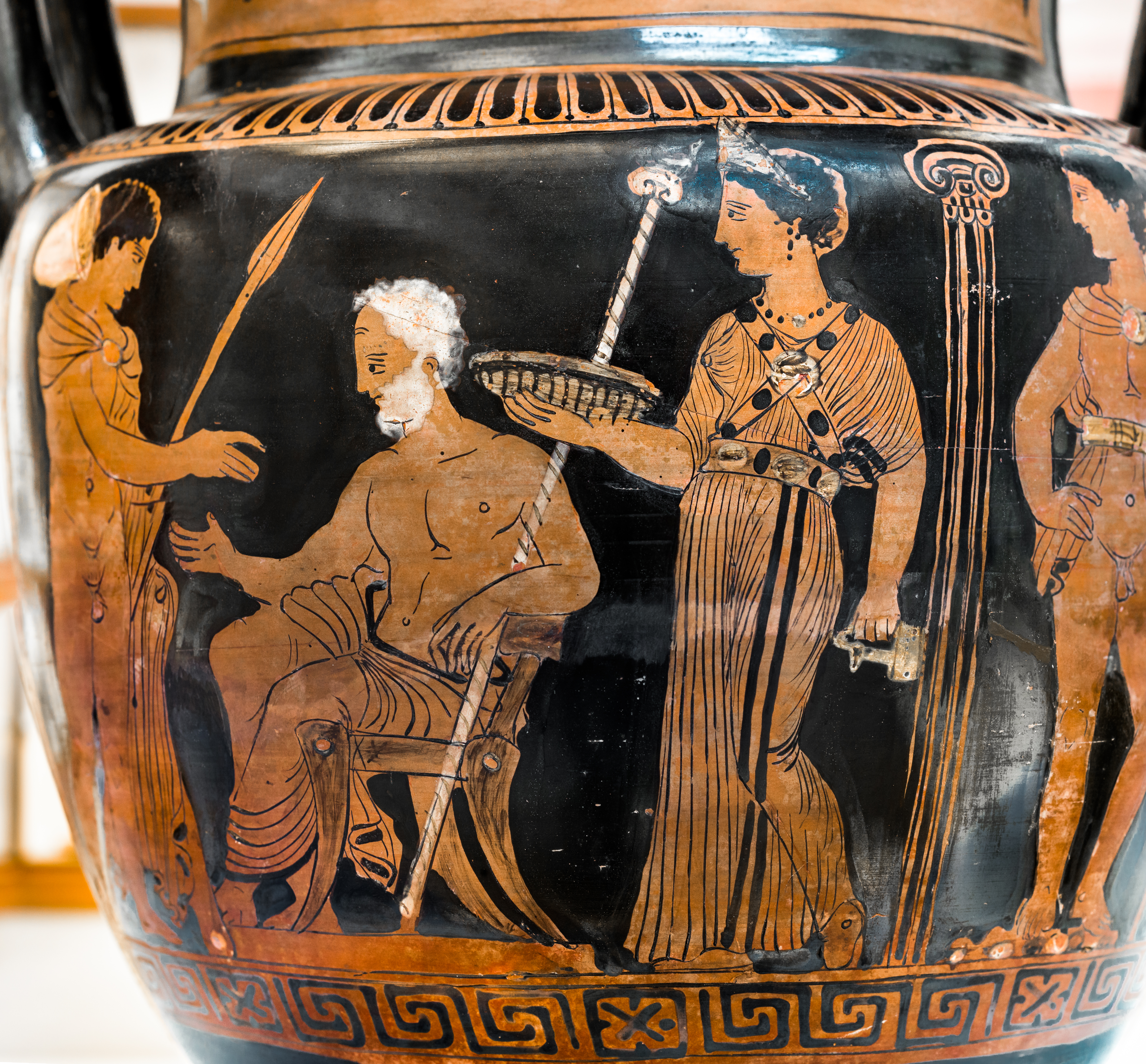
- Vase depicting the Dioskuri (either side) with Tyndareus (white beard) and Leda

Legendary King of Sparta
- Predecessor: Hippocoon
- Successor: Menelaus
- Born: Greece
- Died: Greece
- Buried: Therapne, Sparta
- Wife: Leda
- Issue: Castor; Clytemnestra; Timandra; Phoebe; Philonoe; Helen of Troy (stepdaughter); Pollux (stepson)
- Father: Oebalus or Perieres
- Mother: Gorgophone

In Greek mythology, Tyndareus (/tɪnˈdæriəs/ tin-DARR-ee-əs; Ancient Greek: Τυνδάρεος, romanized: Tundáreos; Attic Greek: Τυνδάρεως, romanized: Tundáreōs, IPA: [tyndáreɔːs]) was a Spartan king.

== Family ==
Tyndareus was the son of Oebalus (or Perieres) and Gorgophone (or Bateia). He married the Aetolian princess, Leda, by whom he became the father of Castor, Clytemnestra, Timandra, Phoebe and Philonoe, and the stepfather of Helen of Troy and Pollux.

== Mythology ==
=== Early years ===
Tyndareus had a brother named Hippocoon, who seized power and exiled Tyndareus. He was reinstated by Heracles, who killed Hippocoon and his sons. Tyndareus's other brother was Icarius, the father of Penelope.

Tyndareus's wife Leda was seduced by Zeus, who disguised himself as a swan. She laid two eggs, each producing two children; Castor and Pollux, and Helen of Troy and Clytemnestra.

When Thyestes seized control in Mycenae, two exiled princes, Agamemnon and Menelaus came to Sparta, where they were received as guests. Tyndareus helped bring them back to their homeland where they drove Thyestes out. The princes eventually married Tyndareus' daughters, Clytemnestra and Helen, respectively.

=== Curse of the goddess ===
According to Stesichorus, while sacrificing to the gods Tyndareus forgot to honor Aphrodite and thus the goddess was angered and made his daughters twice and thrice wed and deserters of their husbands. As Hesiod also says:

And laughter-loving Aphrodite felt jealous when she looked on them and cast them into evil report. Then Timandra deserted Echemus and went and came to Phyleus, dear to the deathless gods; and even so Clytaemnestra deserted god-like Agamemnon and lay with Aegisthus and chose a worse mate; and even so Helen dishonoured the couch of golden-haired Menelaus.

=== Helen and the Trojan War ===
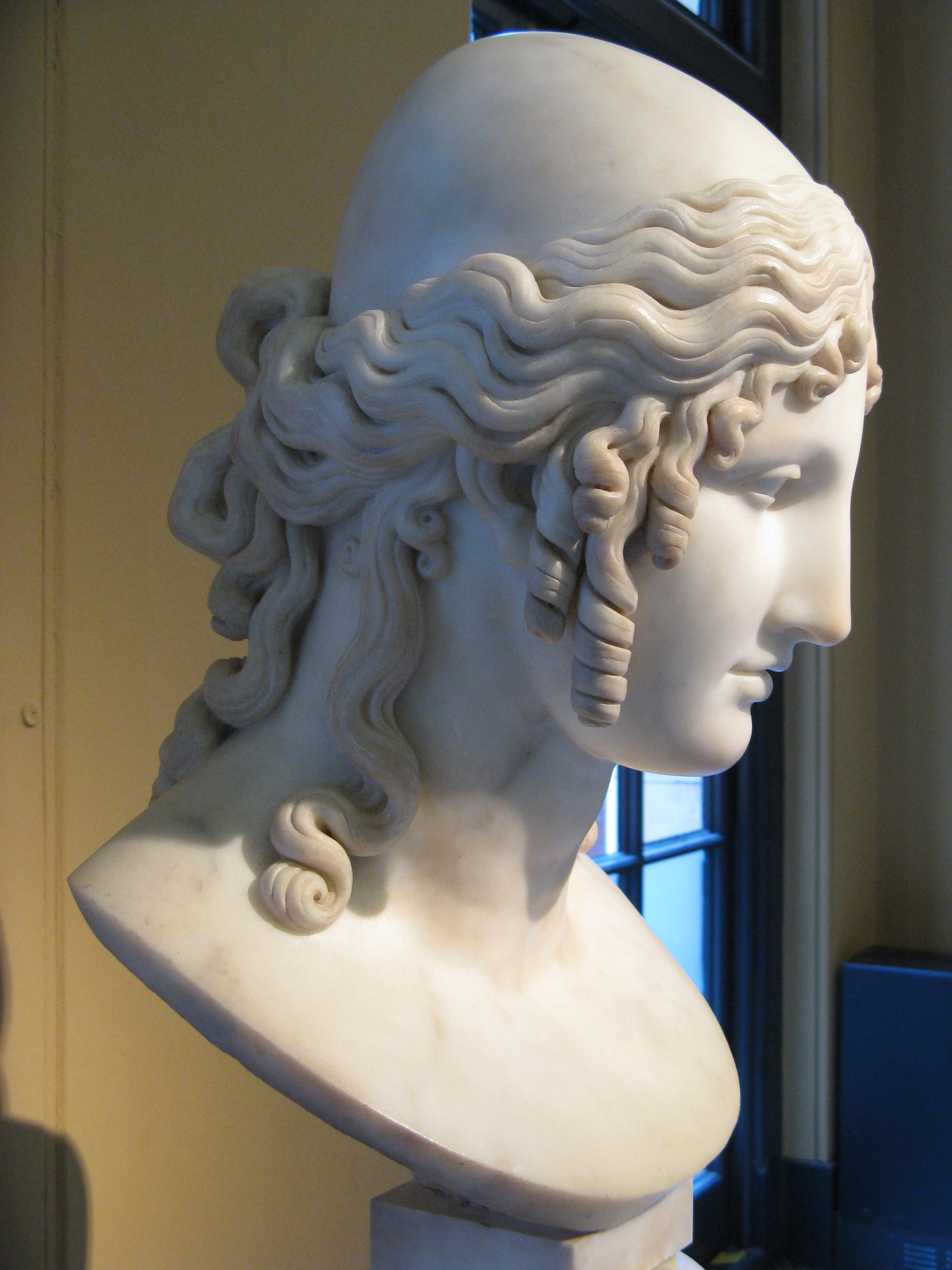
Tyndareus's stepdaughter Helen of Troy

Helen was the most beautiful woman in the world, and when it was time for her to marry, many Greek kings and princes came to seek her hand or sent emissaries to do so on their behalf. Among the contenders were Odysseus, Ajax the Great, Diomedes, Idomeneus, and both Menelaus and Agamemnon. All but Odysseus brought many rich gifts with them, because he knew that Menelaus was by far the greatest in wealth. According to the Ehoiai, Menelaus did not come in person but was represented by his brother Agamemnon, who chose to support his brother's case, and himself married Helen's half-sister Clytemnestra instead.

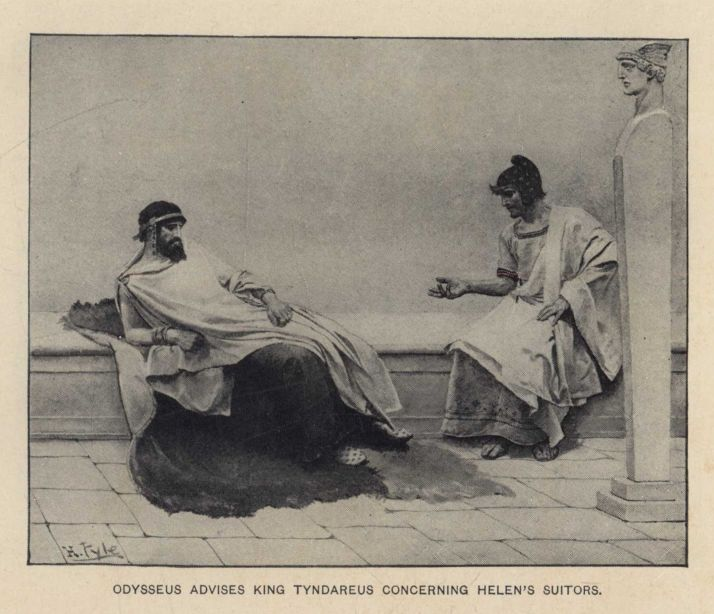
Illustration of Odysseus advising Tyndareus

Tyndareus would accept none of the gifts, nor would he send any of the suitors away for fear of offending them and giving grounds for a quarrel. Odysseus promised to solve the problem in a satisfactory manner if Tyndareus would support him in his courting of Penelope, the daughter of Icarius. Tyndareus readily agreed and Odysseus proposed that, before the decision was made, all the suitors should swear a most solemn oath to defend the chosen husband against whoever should quarrel with him.

Tyndareus sacrificed a horse, making the suitors stand on pieces of it as they swore the oath. After this, he chose Menelaus. Odysseus' stratagem had succeeded and the pair were married. Eventually, Tyndareus resigned in favour of his son-in-law and Menelaus became king of Sparta.

Some years later, Paris, a Trojan prince came to Sparta to marry Helen, whom he had been promised by Aphrodite. Helen left with him – either willingly because she had fallen in love with him, or because he kidnapped her, depending on the source – leaving behind Menelaus and Hermione, their nine-year-old daughter. Menelaus attempted to retrieve Helen by calling on all her former suitors to fulfil their oaths, leading to the Trojan War.

=== Afterwards ===
According to Euripides's Orestes, Tyndareus was still alive at the time of Menelaus's return, and was trying to secure the death penalty for his grandson Orestes due to the latter's murder of his own mother who was also Tyndareus's daughter, Clytemnestra, but according to other accounts he had died prior to the Trojan War. In some versions of the myth, Tyndareus was one of the dead men resurrected by Asclepius to live again.

Regnal titles
Preceded by Oibalos	King of Sparta (first reign)	Succeeded by Hippocoon
Preceded by Hippocoon	King of Sparta (second reign)	Succeeded by Menelaus
