= Gorgythion =

Character in Greek mythology

- Born: Troy
- Died: Troy
- Occupation: soldier
- Parent(s): Priam and Castianeira
- Relatives: Hector, Paris, Deiphobus, Helenus, Polites, Antiphus, Hipponous, Polydorus, Creusa, Laodice, Polyxena, Cassandra, Troilus, Hippothous, Kebriones

In Greek mythology, Gorgythion (Ancient Greek: Γοργυθίων, gen.: Γοργυθίωνος) was one of the sons of King Priam of Troy at the time of the Trojan War and appears as a minor character in Homer's Iliad. His mother was Castianeira of Aisyme.

== Name and description ==
In the Iliad, Gorgythion is described as beautiful, and his epithet is the blameless. Jane Ellen Harrison pointed out that "blameless" (ἀμύμων) was an epithet of the heroized dead, who were venerated and appeased at shrines. Zeus even applies the epithet to Aegisthus, the usurper, Harrison observes.

The epithet άμύμων in Homer is applied to individual heroes, to a hero's tomb [Odyssey xxiv.80], to magical, half-mythical peoples like the Phaeacians and Aethiopians [Iliad x.423] who to the popular imagination are half canonized, to the magic island [Odyssey xii.261] of the god Helios, to the imaginary half-magical Good Old King [Odyssey xix.109]. It is used also of the 'convoy' [Iliad vi.171] sent by the gods, which of course is magical in character; it is never, I believe, an epithet of the Olympians themselves. There is about the word a touch of what is magical and demonic rather than actually divine.

In applying "blameless" to Gorgythion, then, the poet may have been reflecting a tradition of cult among his descendants, that was known to Homer or in the Homeric tradition. John Pairman Brown has suggested that Gorgythion's name "surely echoes the Gergithes; the 'Gergithes remnants of the Teucrians' are projected back into the heroic age as individual antagonists".

According to Herodotus, the Gergithes were "the remnants of the ancient Teucrians" (that is, of the ancient Trojans).

== Family ==
Near the end of the Iliad, Priam himself tells Achilles: "I begat the bravest sons in wide Troy, of whom I say that none are left. Fifty there were to me, when the sons of the Greeks arrived; nineteen indeed from one womb, but the others women bore to me in my palaces. And of the greater number fierce Mars indeed has relaxed the knees under them..." Gorgythion is referred to at his death as "...the brave son of Priam". Of Gorgythion's mother Castianeira, Homer says (in Samuel Butler's translation) "His mother, fair Castianeira, lovely as a goddess, had been married from Aesyme."

The Bibliotheca says that Priam had nine sons and four daughters by Hecuba (the sons being Hector, Paris, Deiphobus, Helenus, Pammon, Polites, Antiphus, Hipponous, Polydorus, and the daughters Creusa, Laodice, Polyxena, and the prophetess Cassandra), and he names thirty-eight sons by other women, including Troilus, Hippothous, Kebriones, and Gorgythion.

In the Fabulae of Gaius Julius Hyginus, fable 90 consists wholly of a list of "Sons and daughters of Priam to the number of fifty-five", in which Gorgythion is included.

== Mythology ==
Gorgythion is killed by an arrow of Teucer's at lines 303–305 of Book VIII of the Iliad, although Teucer's target is Gorgythion's brother Hector. Teucer aims two arrows at Hector, but kills first Gorgythion and next Hector's charioteer Archeptolemus, which serves to increase the impression of Hector's elusiveness and strength.

When Gorgythion dies, Homer says –

And as a poppy, which in the garden is weighed down with fruit and vernal showers, droops its head to one side, so did his head incline aside, depressed by the helmet.

Susanne Lindgren Wofford comments on this simile "But the poppy is not wilted or dead, just top-heavy; in any case, a poppy will return every spring to bow its head, but Gorgythion's death is final; it is a unique event that does not participate in any natural cycles of renewal or return... to make death seem beautiful is to transform it into something different."

In Alexander Pope's looser but more poetic translation (1715–1720), the death scene reads –

The weapon flies
At Hector's breast, and sings along the skies:
He miss’d the mark; but pierced Gorgythio’s heart,
And drench’d in royal blood the thirsty dart.
(Fair Castianira, nymph of form divine,
This offspring added to king Priam’s line.)
As full-blown poppies, overcharged with rain,
Decline the head, and drooping kiss the plain;
So sinks the youth: his beauteous head, depress’d
Beneath his helmet, drops upon his breast.

This translation of the Iliad was called by Samuel Johnson "a performance which no age or nation could hope to equal", while Richard Bentley wrote: "It is a pretty poem, Mr Pope, but you must not call it Homer."

In the 4th century AD, a Roman called Q. Septimius published Dictys Cretensis Ephemeridos belli Trojani, purporting to be a translation by Lucius Septimius of a chronicle of the Trojan War by Dictys of Crete, the companion of Idomeneus during the Trojan War. In Book 3, Patroclus, and not Teucer, is said to have killed Gorgythion:

Patroclus, however, had seen the enemy coming. Protected by his armor and holding a spear he had snatched from the ground, he resisted more boldly. He slew Gorgythion and drove off Deiphobus, Gorgythion's brother, wounding him in the leg with his spear.

== Other uses of the name ==
- The name Gorgythion was given to a genus of Pyrginae, North American butterflies commonly known as Spread-winged Skippers, in Frederick Du Cane Godman and O. Salvin's Biologia Centrali Americana (1896).
- 48373 Gorgythion is an asteroid of the Solar System, discovered on 16 October 1977, by C. J. van Houten and I. van Houten-Groeneveld.

== See also ==
- List of children of Priam
- List of Trojan War characters
