= Pammon =

In Greek mythology, Pammon (Ancient Greek: Πάμμων, romanized: Pámmōn, lit. 'all-kind', 'all-gentle' or 'very rich/ abundant') was a Trojan prince and one of the sons of King Priam of Troy and Hecuba. He was killed by Achilles' son Neoptolemus during the Trojan War.

== Family ==
According to Pseudo-Apollodorus, King Priam had nine sons and four daughters by Hecuba; the sons being Hector, Paris, Deiphobus, Helenus, Pammon, Polites, Antiphus, Hipponous, Polydorus, and the daughters Creusa, Laodice, Polyxena, and the prophetess Cassandra. He also names thirty-eight sons by other women, including Troilus, Hippothous, Kebriones, Gorgythion, and Antiphonus.

== Mythology ==
Pammon was chosen by Eurypylus of Mysia, along with Alexander, Aeneas, Polydamas, Deiphobus and Aethicus, as a commander to lead the Trojan host after the death of Hector. However, during the attack on the Greek camp, his charioteer, Hippasides, was killed by Alcimedon, a companion of Ajax the Lesser, and Pammon was forced to flee. Later, during the fall of Troy, Pammon together with his brothers Polites and Antiphonus, were killed by Neoptolemus, Achilles' son.

== See also ==
- List of children of Priam
