= List of children of Priam =

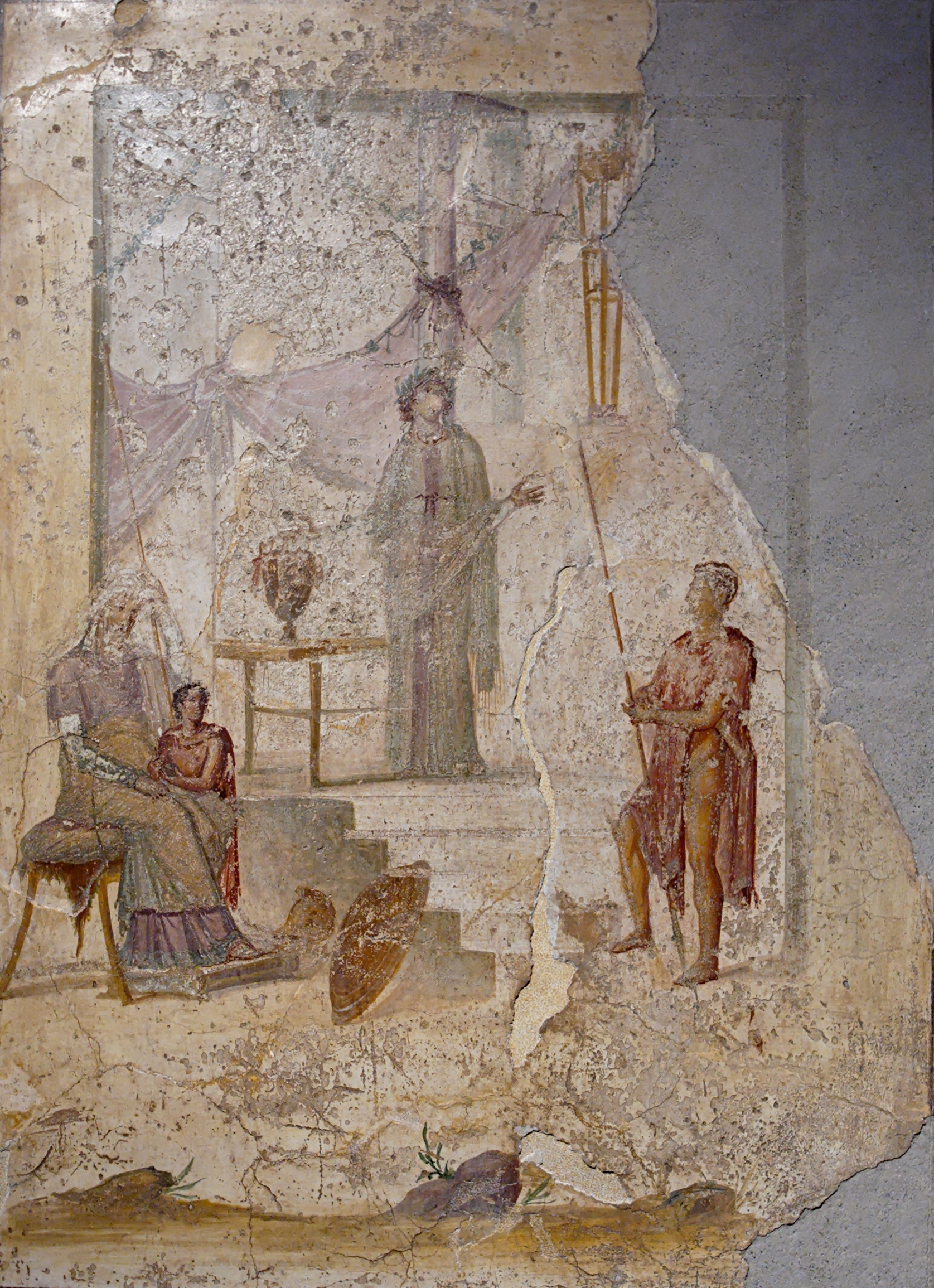
Priam with Paris, Cassandra and Hector. Fresco from Pompeii, c. 20-30 AD

In Greek mythology, Priam, the mythical king of Troy during the Trojan War, supposedly had 50 sons and several daughters, though names often varied across sources. Priam had several wives, the primary one Hecuba, daughter of Dymas or Cisseus, and several concubines, who bore his children. There is no exhaustive list, but many of them are mentioned in various Greek myths. Almost all of Priam's children were slain by the Greeks in the course of the war, or shortly after.

The three main sources for the names of the children of Priam are: Homer's Iliad, where a number of his sons are briefly mentioned among the defenders of Troy; and two lists in the Bibliotheca and Hyginus' Fabulae. Virgil also mentions some of Priam's sons and daughters in the Aeneid. Some of the daughters taken captive at the end of the war are mentioned by Pausanias, who in his turn refers to paintings by Polygnotus in the Lesche of Delphi.

== Sons ==
Name	Sources						Mother, if known	Notes
Name	Homer	Apollodorus	Hyginus	Virgil	Dictys	Others	Mother, if known	Notes
Hector	✓	✓	✓	✓	✓		Hecuba	Central Trojan hero in Trojan War; heir apparent; killed by Achilles, who attached Hector's body to his chariot and dragged it around city.
Paris	✓	✓	✓	✓	✓		Hecuba	Raised as a shepherd; his marriage with Helen launched the Trojan War; killed by Philoctetes.
Deiphobus	✓	✓	✓	✓	✓		Hecuba	Maybe the most cunning of Trojan princes, married Helen after Paris' death. He was slain during the sack of Troy by Odysseus and/or Menelaus.
Helenus	✓	✓	✓	✓	✓		Hecuba	The twin of Cassandra and, like her, a seer. Lost out to Deiphobus in competition for the hand of Helen after Paris's death. Later marries Andromache.
Polydorus	✓	✓	✓	✓	✓		Hecuba or Laothoe	Youngest of the sons. Killed by King Polymestor of Thrace or killed by Achilles or survived
Troilus	✓	✓	✓	✓	✓		Hecuba	Possibly fathered by Apollo. Killed by Achilles
Polites	✓	✓	✓	✓	✓		Hecuba	Killed by Neoptolemus when Troy was sacked
Hippothous	✓		✓		✓			Killed by the Ajaxes
Kebriones	✓	✓	✓					Killed by Patroclus with a stone
Gorgythion	✓	✓	✓		✓		Castianeira	Killed in battle by Teucer, whose arrow was aimed at Hector, or by Patroclus
Agathon	✓	✓	✓		✓			Killed by Ajax the Great
Mestor	✓	✓	✓		✓	✓		Killed by Achilles or taken as a slave by Neoptolemus
Chromius	✓	✓	✓					Killed by Diomedes
Doryclus	✓	✓	✓		✓			Killed by Ajax
Democoon	✓	✓	✓					Killed by Odysseus in his rage of a lost comrade at the spear of Antiphus
Antiphus	✓	✓			✓		Hecuba	Killed by Agamemnon or Ajax the Great
Lycaon	✓	✓			✓		Laothoe	Killed by Achilles
Pammon	✓	✓			✓		Hecuba	Killed by Neoptolemus when Troy was sacked
Dius	✓		✓					
Isus	✓							Killed by Agamemnon
Antiphonus	✓							Killed by Neoptolemus when Troy was sacked
Echemmon	✓	✓			✓			Killed by Diomedes or by Odysseus
Archemachus		✓	✓		✓			Killed by Agamemnon
Aretus		✓	✓		✓			Killed by a spear from Automedon or by Odysseus
Ascanius	✓	✓	✓					
Bias		✓	✓		✓			Killed by Idomeneus
Deiopites		✓	✓		✓			Killed by Meges when Troy was sacked or killed by Agamemnon
Dryops		✓	✓		✓			Killed by Achilles or Idomeneus
Evagoras		✓	✓					
Evander		✓	✓		✓			Sacrificed at the funeral of Patroclus by Achilles
Hyperochus		✓	✓					
Polymedon		✓	✓					
Aegeoneus		✓						
Aesacus		✓			✓	✓	Arisbe or Alexirhoe	A seer; turned into a diving bird or killed by Agamemnon
Astygonus		✓						
Atas		✓						
Chersidamas		✓	✓					Killed by Odysseus
Clonius		✓						
Echephron		✓						
Glaucus		✓			✓			Killed by Ajax the Greater
Hippodamas		✓			✓			Killed by Achilles or the Ajaxes
Hipponous		✓					Hecuba	Killed by Achilles just before the latter's death
Hyperion		✓						
Idomeneus		✓						
Laodocus		✓			✓			Killed by Agamemnon
Lysithous		✓						
Melanippus		✓				✓		Shot to death by Teucer
Mylius		✓			✓			Killed by the Ajaxes
Philaemon		✓						
Telestas		✓			✓			Killed by Diomedes
Antinous			✓					
Astynomus			✓					Killed by Achilles
Axion			✓			✓		Killed by Eurypylus
Brissonius			✓					
Cheirodamas			✓					
Chrysolaus			✓					
Dolon			✓					
Eresus			✓					
Hero(n)			✓					
Hippasus			✓					
Hipposidus			✓					
Ilagus			✓					
Lysides			✓					
Palaemon			✓					
Polymelus			✓					
Proneos			✓					
Protodamas			✓					
Chaon				✓		✓		Namesake of Chaonia; accidentally killed by Helenus or sacrificed himself to stop a plague
Agavus					✓			Killed by Ajax the Great
Asteropaeus					✓			Killed by Achilles
Chorithan					✓			Killed by Idomeneus
Ilioneus					✓	✓		Killed by Ajax the Lesser
Philenor					✓			Killed by Ajax the Lesser or Agamemnon
Thyestes					✓			Killed by Diomedes
Idaeus						✓		
Amphimachus						✓		Perhaps a stand-in for the elder Antimachus; advocated for war with the Greeks
Pisus					✓			Sacrificed at the funeral of Patroclus by Achilles
Munippus						✓	Cilla	Born on the same day as Paris; killed alongside his mother by Priam to spare Paris
Tisiphonus						✓		Husband of Hippodameia, daughter of Antimachus; killed by Neoptolemus when Troy was sacked
Diores			✓	✓				Participant in the funeral games of Anchises
Laocoön		✓	✓	✓		✓		Also said to be a son of Antenor or Acoetes; killed alongside his sons by Poseidon or Athena after warning the Trojans about the wooden horse
Astynous					✓			Killed by Agamemnon

== Daughters ==
Name	Sources					Mother, if known	Notes
Name	Homer	Apollodorus	Hyginus	Pausanias	Virgil	Mother, if known	Notes
Cassandra	✓	✓	✓	✓	✓	Hecuba	Helenus' twin, Priestess of Apollo and by him given the gift of prophecy, but cursed never to be believed; taken as a slave by Agamemnon and murdered by Clytemnestra
Laodice	✓	✓	✓	✓		Hecuba	Homer calls her the most beautiful of Priam's daughters; swallowed by the earth when Troy was sacked
Medesicaste	✓	✓	✓	✓			An illegitimate daughter; was married to Imbrius
Creusa		✓	✓	✓	✓	Hecuba	Married to Aeneas; died when Troy was sacked
Medusa		✓	✓	✓			
Aristodeme		✓					
Lysimache		✓					
Polyxena		✓		✓	✓	Hecuba	Captured by the Greeks, and later sacrificed on Achilles' tomb to cause a wind back to Greece
Demnosia			✓				
Demosthea			✓				
Ethionome			✓				
Henicea			✓				
Iliona			✓		✓	Hecuba	Eldest daughter
Lysianassa			✓				
Nereis			✓				
Phegea			✓				
Philomela			✓				
Aristomache				✓			Was married to Critolaus, son of Hicetaon

Pausanias enlists several more Trojan captive women, who may or may not be daughters of Priam: Clymene, Xenodice, Deinome, Metioche, Peisis, Cleodice. He remarks, however, that of these only Clymene and Deinome were mentioned in literary sources known to him, and that the rest of the names could have been invented by Polygnotus.

== Footnotes ==
- Aeneas – who later led the survivors of Troy – was not a son of Priam, but his father Anchises was Priam's second cousin, making Aeneas Priam's second cousin once removed. Aeneas did, however, marry Priam's daughter Creusa, making him a son-in-law of Priam. Ascanius, the son of Aeneas and Creusa, was himself the ancestor of Romulus and Remus.
- According to Homer:
  - Lycaon is the son of Laothoe.
  - Gorgythion is the son of Castianeira.
- According to Apollodorus:
  - Aesacus's mother is Arisbe, daughter of Merops.
  - Hecuba, daughter of Dymas is the mother of Hector, Paris, Deiphobus, Helenus, Pammon, Polites, Antiphus, Hipponous, Polydorus, Troilus (Troilus may be the son of Apollo), Laodice, Polyxena, Cassandra and Creusa.
- In Mozart's opera Idomeneo, Ilia is mentioned as another daughter of Priam.
- Italian writer Giovanni Boccaccio, in his Genealogy of the Pagan Gods, mentions many of the above children along with the following additions, citing the now lost works of Paul of Perugia and Barlaam of Seminara:
  - Lycaste, a daughter of Priam and a concubine. She married Polydamas, son of Antenor.
  - Teucer, a son of Priam and the nymph Anthydona. Before the Trojan War began, he was mauled to death by a bear in the Bebrycian woods.
  - Phorbas, a son of Priam and Epythesia, daughter of Stasyppus of Mygdonia. He was so advanced in age that at times he was thought to be Priam's brother rather than his son, and was advised against fighting in the Trojan War. Nonetheless, he entered battle and was slain by Menelaus. He was the father of Ilioneus, a Trojan slain by Peneleos or a companion of Aeneas.
  - Iphitus and Testhorius, twin sons of Priam and the nymph Perivia. Both were slain by Antilochus, son of Nestor.
- Dictys Cretensis mentions two unnamed sons of Priam who were killed during the Greek landing on the shores of Troy, as well as another unnamed son whom Achilles captured, cutting his hands off and sending him back to Troy to deliver the news of Hector's death.
