= Antiphonus =

Character in Greek mythology

In Greek mythology, Antiphonus (Ancient Greek: Ἀντίφονος, romanized: Antíphonos, lit. 'in revenge for blood') was a Trojan prince as one of the sons of King Priam of Troy.

== Mythology ==
Antiphonus was killed along with his brothers Polites and Pammon by Neoptolemus, Achilles' son, during the siege of the city.

== See also ==
- List of children of Priam
