= Agathon (mythology) =

Figure from Greek mythology

In Greek mythology, Agathon (/ˈæɡəθɒn/; Ancient Greek: Ἀγάθων) was one of the sons of King Priam of Troy by other women. He was one of the last surviving princes during the Trojan War. In another account, Agathon and his brothers, Antiphus, Agavus and Glaucus, were instead all slain by Ajax, son of Telamon.

== See also ==
- List of children of Priam
