= Telestas =

Trojan prince in Greek mythology; son of King Priam

In Greek mythology, Telestas (Ancient Greek: Τελέστας) or Telestes was a Trojan prince as one of the sons of King Priam of Troy by an unknown woman. He and his brother Thyestes were killed by Diomedes.

== See also ==
- List of children of Priam
