= Acamas (son of Theseus) =

Ancient Greek mythological son of Theseus

- Exiled Prince of Athens
- Member of the Athenian Royal Family
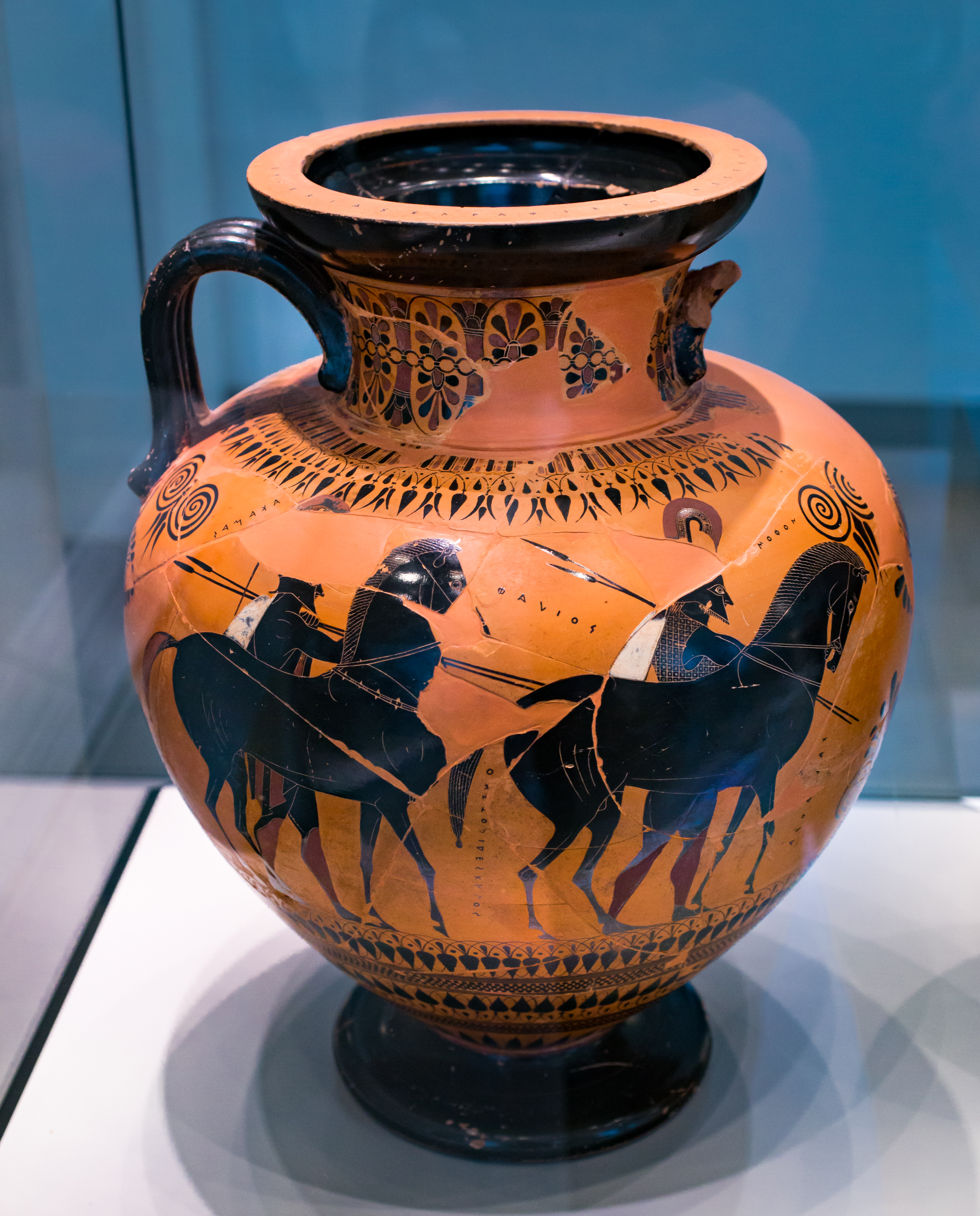
- Acamas and Demophon on a neck amphora by Exekias
- Abode: Athens, later Euboea

Genealogy
- Parents: Theseus and Phaedra
- Siblings: Demophon, Hippolytus
- Consort: Laodice
- Offspring: Munitus

In Greek mythology, Acamas or Akamas (/ɑːˈkɑːmɑːs/;Ancient Greek: Ἀκάμας) was a hero in the Trojan War.

== Family ==
Acamas was the son of King Theseus of Athens and Phaedra, daughter of Minos. He was the brother or half brother to Demophon.

== Mythology ==
After his father lost the throne of Athens, Acamas grew up as an exile in Euboea with his brother under the care of Elephenor, a relative by marriage. He and Diomedes were sent to negotiate the return of Helen before the start of the Trojan War, though Homer ascribes this embassy to Menelaus and Odysseus. During his stay at Troy he caught the eye of Priam's daughter Laodice, and fathered her son Munitus. The boy was raised by Aethra, Acamas' grandmother, who was living in Troy as one of Helen's slaves. Munitus later died of a snakebite while hunting at Olynthus in Thrace.

In the war, Acamas fought on the side of the Greeks and was counted among the men inside the Trojan Horse. After the war, he rescued Aethra from her long captivity in Troy. Later mythological traditions describe the two brothers embarking on other adventures as well, including the capture of the Palladium. Some sources relate of Acamas the story which is more commonly told of his brother Demophon, namely the one of his relationship with Phyllis of Thrace. This might be a mistake.

Acamas is not mentioned in Homer's Iliad, but later works, including Virgil's Aeneid, and almost certainly the Iliou persis, mention that Acamas was one of the men inside the Trojan horse. The dominant character trait of Acamas is his interest in faraway places.

== Eponyms and Acamas in art ==
The promontory of Acamas in Cyprus, the town of Acamantion in Phrygia, and the Attic tribe Acamantis all derived their names from him.
