= Lysithous =

Mythological Greek character

In Greek mythology, Lysithous (Ancient Greek: Λυσίθοος) was a Trojan prince as one of the sons of King Priam of Troy by an unknown woman.

== See also ==
- List of children of Priam
