= Polymedon =

Ancient Greek mythology character

In Greek mythology, Polymedon (Ancient Greek: Πολυμέδων) is a son of king Priam mentioned in Hyginus's Fabulae and the Bibliotheca. His mother's name is unknown.

== See also ==
- List of children of Priam
