= Astynomus =

Several Greek mythological characters

Astynomus (Ancient Greek: Αστυνόμος) was the name given to several people from Greek history and mythology:

- Astynomus was a Trojan prince as one of the sons of King Priam of Troy by an unknown woman.
- Astynomus was a Greek writer who wrote a work about Cyprus, and was mentioned by Pliny the Elder in his Natural History

== See also ==
- List of children of Priam
