= Philaemon (prince) =

In Greek mythology, Philaemon (Ancient Greek: Φιλαίμων) was a Trojan prince as one of the sons of King Priam of Troy by an unknown woman.

== See also ==
- List of children of Priam
