= Aegeoneus =

In Greek mythology, Aegeoneus (Ancient Greek: Αἰγεωνεύς) was a Trojan prince as one of the sons of King Priam of Troy by an unknown woman.

== See also ==
- List of children of Priam
