= Isus (mythology) =

In Greek mythology, Isus (Ancient Greek: Ἶσος) was a minor character mentioned in Homer's Iliad, one of the 50 sons of King Priam by an unidentified woman. He was killed by Agamemnon. Little is known of Isus other than brief mentions or relatives. He was known as a half-brother of Antiphus, son of Priam and Hecuba.

== See also ==
- List of children of Priam
