= Exekias =

Ancient Athenian vase painter

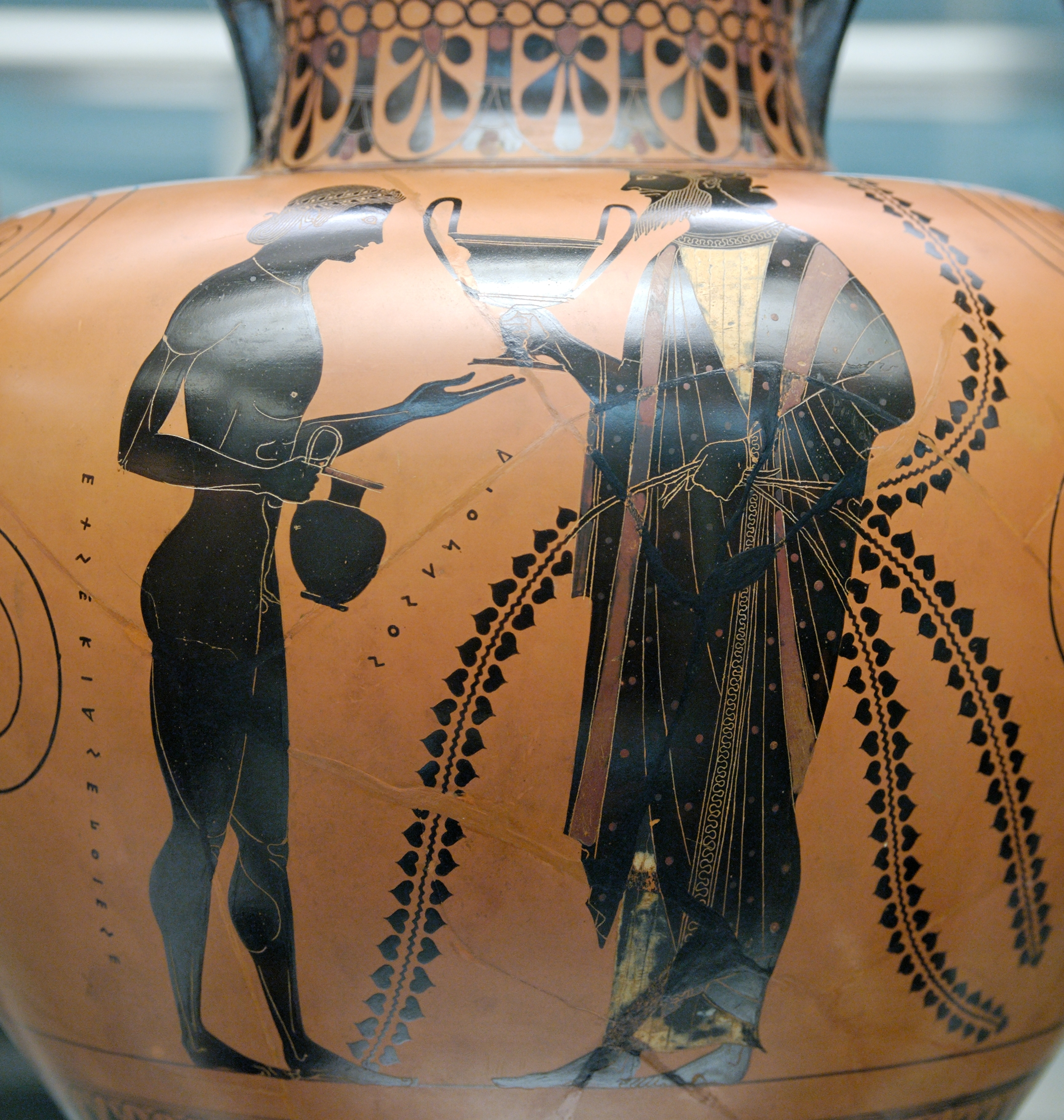
- Dionysos, the god of wine, with his son Oenopion, Attic black-figure amphora, dated ca. 540–530 BC, located in the British Museum (B 210)
- Born: Exekias before 550 BC; Probably Athens
- Died: About 525 BC
- Known for: Vase painting
- Notable work: High-quality vases for export and home consumption
- Movement: Black-figure style, Group E

Exekias (Ancient Greek: Ἐξηκίας, Exēkías) was an ancient Greek vase painter and potter who was active in Athens between roughly 545 BC and 530 BC. Exekias worked mainly in the black-figure technique, which involved the painting of scenes using a clay slip that fired to black, with details created through incision. Exekias is regarded by art historians as an artistic visionary whose masterful use of incision and psychologically sensitive compositions mark him as one of the greatest of all Attic vase painters. The Andokides painter and the Lysippides Painter are thought to have been students of Exekias.

== Background ==
The works of Exekias are distinguished by their innovative compositions, precise draughtsmanship, and subtle psychological characterization, all of which transcend the inherent challenges of the black-figure technique. John Boardman, the eminent historian of Greek art, described Exekias' style as follows: "The hallmark of his style is a near statuesque dignity which brings vase painting for the first time close to claiming a place as a major art." He was an innovative painter and potter, who experimented with new shapes and devised unusual painting techniques, such as the use of a coral-red slip, to enhance colour.

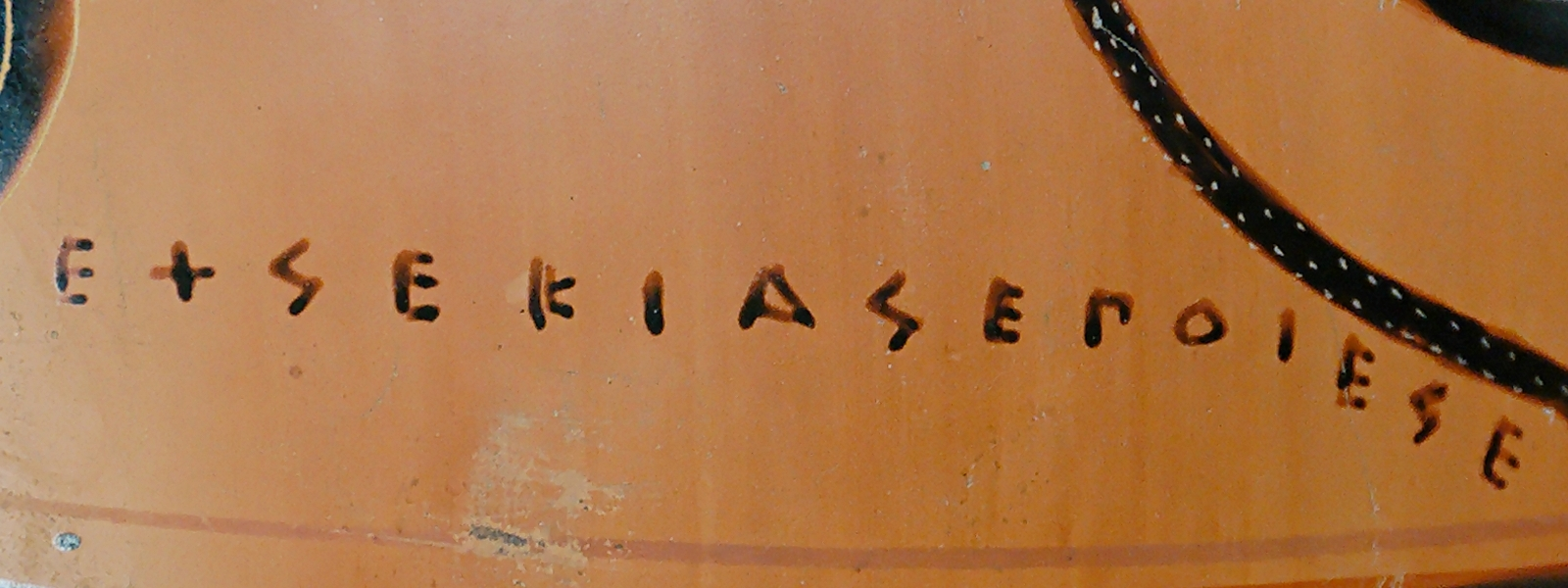
Exekias' signature as potter: ΕΧΣΕΚΙΑΣΕΠΟΙΕΣΕ (“Exekias made [me]”), ca. 545–540 BC, Louvre F 53

Fourteen signed works by Exekias have survived, while many more have been attributed to him based on the stylistic connoisseurship method developed by John Beazley. His signed pieces provide insight not only into the work of Exekias himself but also into the way ancient pottery workshops operated. Twelve of the fourteen vessels bearing his name refer to him not as their painter but as their potter, by adding the word epoíēsen (ἐποίησεν) to his name. This may be translated as "Exekias made [me]", in contrast to égrapsen (ἓγραψεν), which translates as "painted [me]" (literally: "drew [me]"). On two amphorae, Berlin 1720 and Vatican 344, both terms are used in the iambic trimeter inscription, Exēkías égrapse kapoíēsé me ("Exekias made and painted me"), indicating that in these cases Exekias was responsible for both the potting of the vase and its painted decoration. Fragments of a third amphora (Taranto 179196) also show the use of both terms, when the inscriptions are restored. This leads to speculation regarding the meaning of the epoíēsen signatures and why, in some instances, Exekias signed only as potter on vases that he clearly painted as well. It has been suggested that he chose to sign as painter only the works he was particularly proud of. According to a different approach, Exekias' epoíēsen signatures could be understood as functioning as a general workshop stamp, which would mean that Exekias may have simply been the master-potter who supervised the production of the vessel. Seven of the vessels signed "Exēkias epoíēsen," however, carry too little decoration to afford comparison. Only two of the remaining vases signed with epoíēsen can be attributed to the same hand as those signed "... égrapse kapoíēsé me"—that is, to the painter Exekias. Beazley attributed one of the vases with the potter-only signature to the so-called Group E, to which Exekias is closely related.

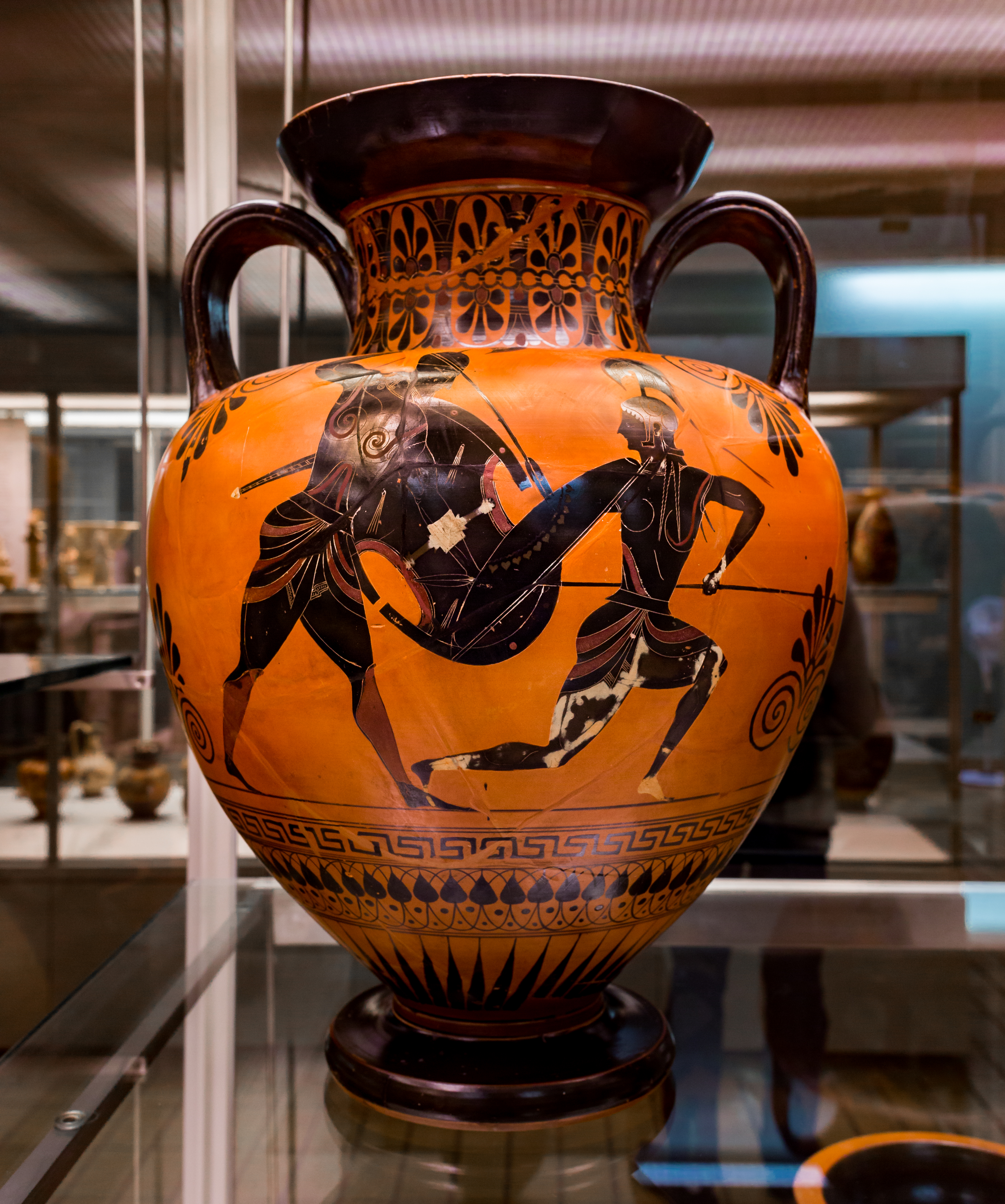
Attic black-figure neck amphora found in Vulci; British Museum

While Exekias' work itself offers a glimpse of the culture of ancient pottery, the find spots of his vases also reveal information about the market in which Exekias positioned himself. Fragments of column krater and a hydria attributed to Exekias were excavated on the Athenian Acropolis, suggesting that Exekias maintained a clientele in his home city. The fact that two of his vases were found on the Acropolis, an important religious sanctuary, underscores his prestige as a vase painter. Exekias not only enjoyed a thriving market in Athens; many of his extant vases were also exported to Etruria, Italy, found at sites such as Vulci and Orvieto, where they were buried in Etruscan tombs. Being admirers of Greeks and their arts and letters, the Etruscans developed a taste for Greek vases, over 30,000 of which have been found in the region. The presence of Exekias' work in Etruria indicates that foreigners also admired his vases, and that he catered to markets both at home and abroad.

== Group E ==
In the words of Beazley, Group E is "the soil from which the art of Exekias springs, the tradition which on his way from fine craftsman to true artist he absorbs and transcends.” Based on the overarching stylistic similarities between the work of Group E and Exekias, Beazley hypothesized that Exekias first began his career in the workshop of the so-called Group E artists. "Group E" produced work that is not only considered closely related to the work of Exekias, but also represents a conscious break from the pottery traditions of the first half of the sixth century BC. Group E has been credited with the development of new, elegant vessel shapes such as the "Type A amphora". Exekias, however, is the only member of the Group who signed his products which suggests that Exekias may have been responsible for the development of such vessel shapes as the Type A cup, the Type A belly amphora and the calyx krater. Apart from the specialization in certain vessel shapes, the Group E artists also shared a common range of subjects: the birth of Athena, Theseus fighting the Minotaur, Herakles fighting the Nemean Lion, and Herakles and the three-bodied Geryon, are among the themes most often pictured on vases by this group.

== Vessel shapes ==
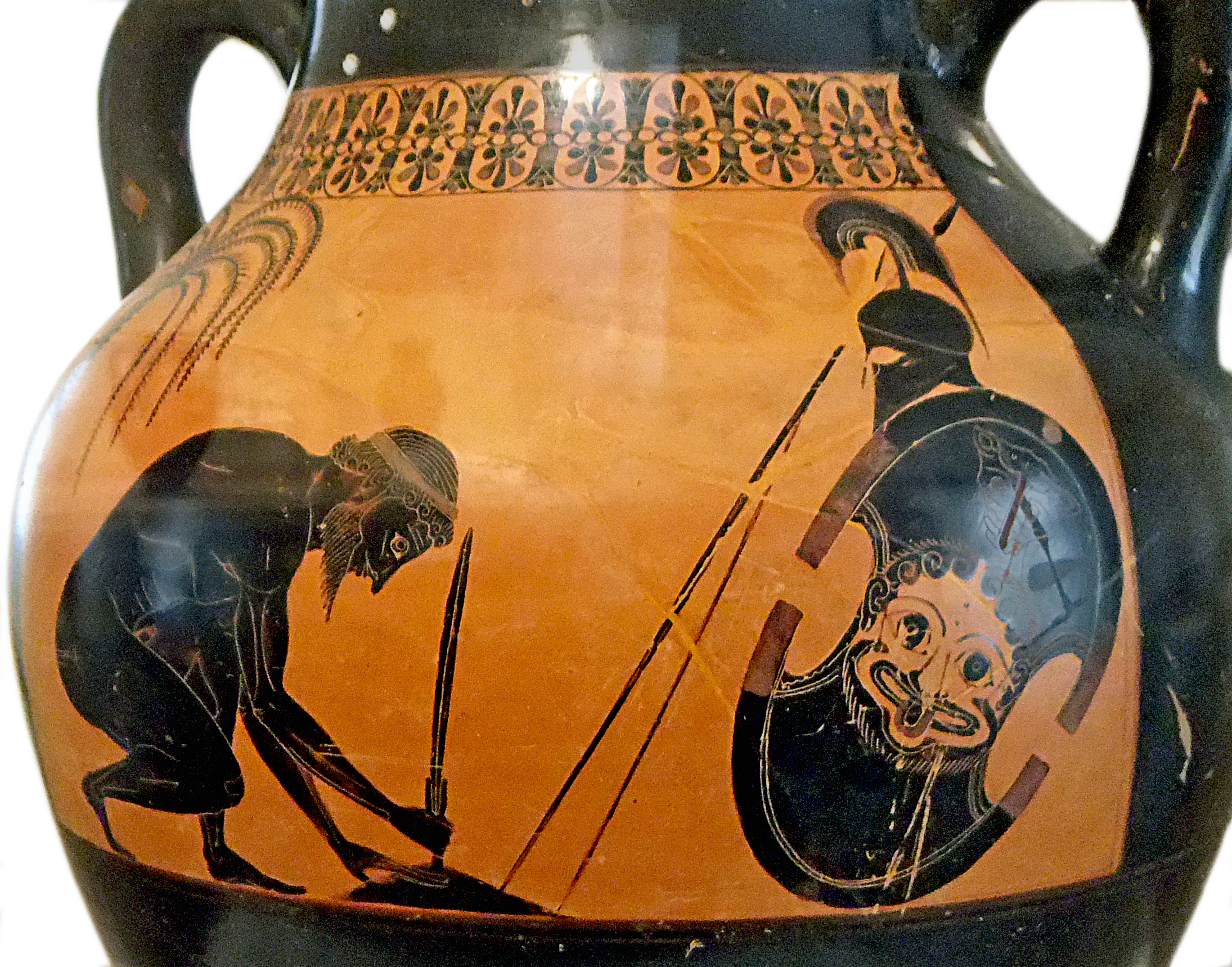
Suicide of Ajax, by the Athenian Black-Figure Master, Exekias

Exekias does not seem to have specialized in a specific vessel type. Among the vases made or decorated by him are neck amphorae, Type A and B amphorae, calyx kraters, column kraters, Type A cups, dinoi, hydriai, and at least one Panathenaic amphora. Probably his most unusual work is represented by two series of funerary plaques found in Athens (Berlin Antikensammlung 1811, 1814). The plaques, showing the funerary ritual for a deceased man, were probably attached to the walls of a funerary monument.

== Themes ==
External videos
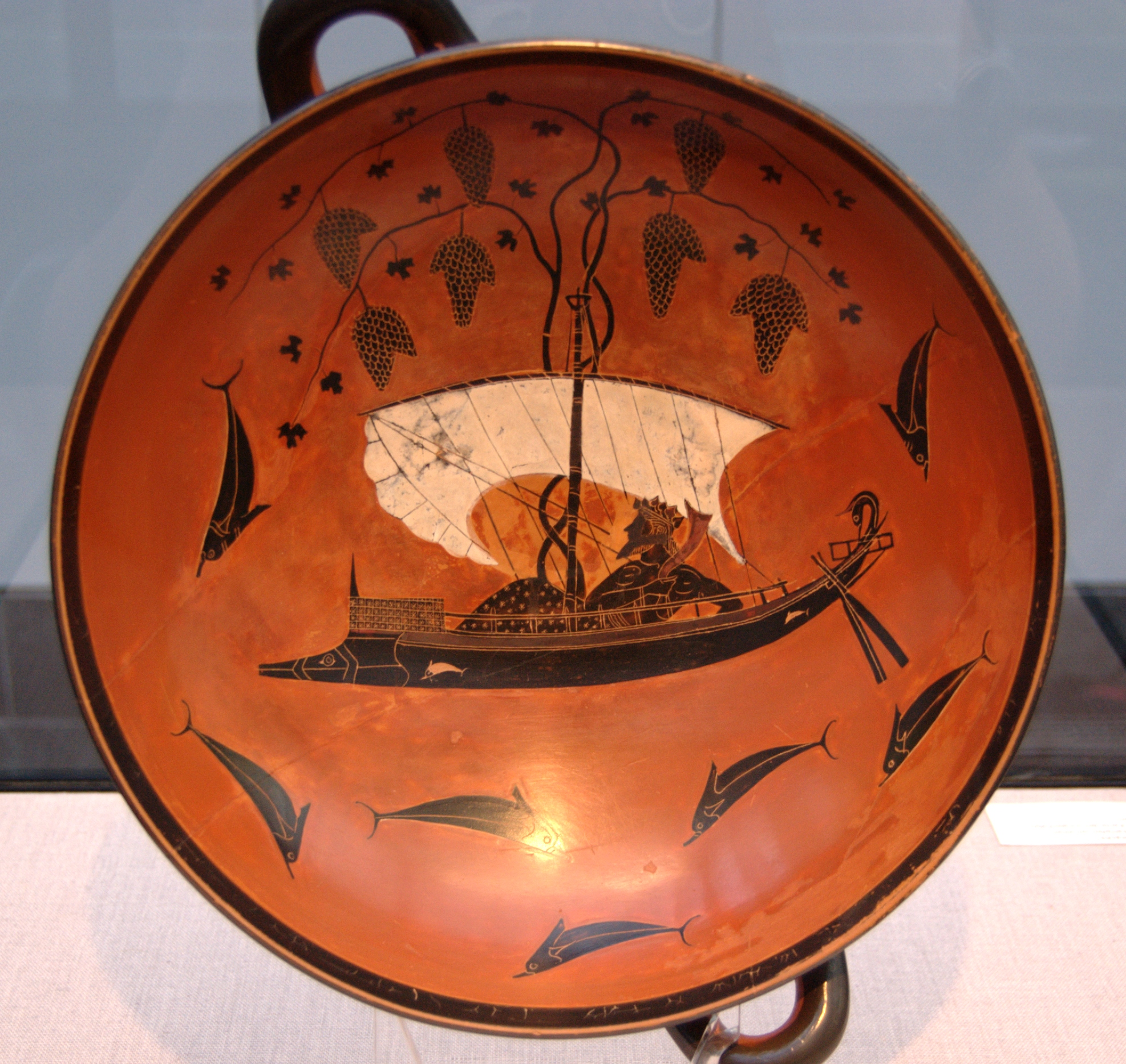
- The Dionysos cup, Staatliche Antikensammlung, Munich
- Exekias, Attic black figure amphora with Ajax and Achilles playing a game Smarthistory
- Exekias, Dionysos Kylix, c. 530 B.C.E Smarthistory

In his vase paintings, Exekias does not only reinterpret the mythological traditions of his time, but at times even sets new fashions. One of his most famous works is the so-called "Dionysus Cup", a kylix now in Munich (Antikensammlung 2044). The kylix falls into the "eye-cup" category and is decorated on the exterior with two pairs of eyes, which may be an original Exekian motif. The interior shows a depiction of the god Dionysos against a background of coral-red slip, which coats the entire picture space. Here, Exekias uses the tondo as a working surface for the main scenario: Dionysus was the god of inspiration, and the painting depicts his initial journey to Athens by ship. Pirates had seized the ship and were planning, perhaps, to sell Dionysus into slavery. Instead, the god caused vines to grow from the mast, frightening the pirates so much that they jumped overboard and were changed into dolphins, here seen swimming around the ship. Exekias is the first Athenian vase painter to depict Dionysus sailing in the expanse of the interior of a cup. While many of Exekias' pieces display an image from a mythological story they are generally not the most famous moments. The "Eye-cup" that depicts Dionysus does not show the God fighting his kidnappers but instead shows him relaxing in his boat with his kidnappers turned into dolphins around him. Exekias could have chosen any moment, but this is the one he painted.

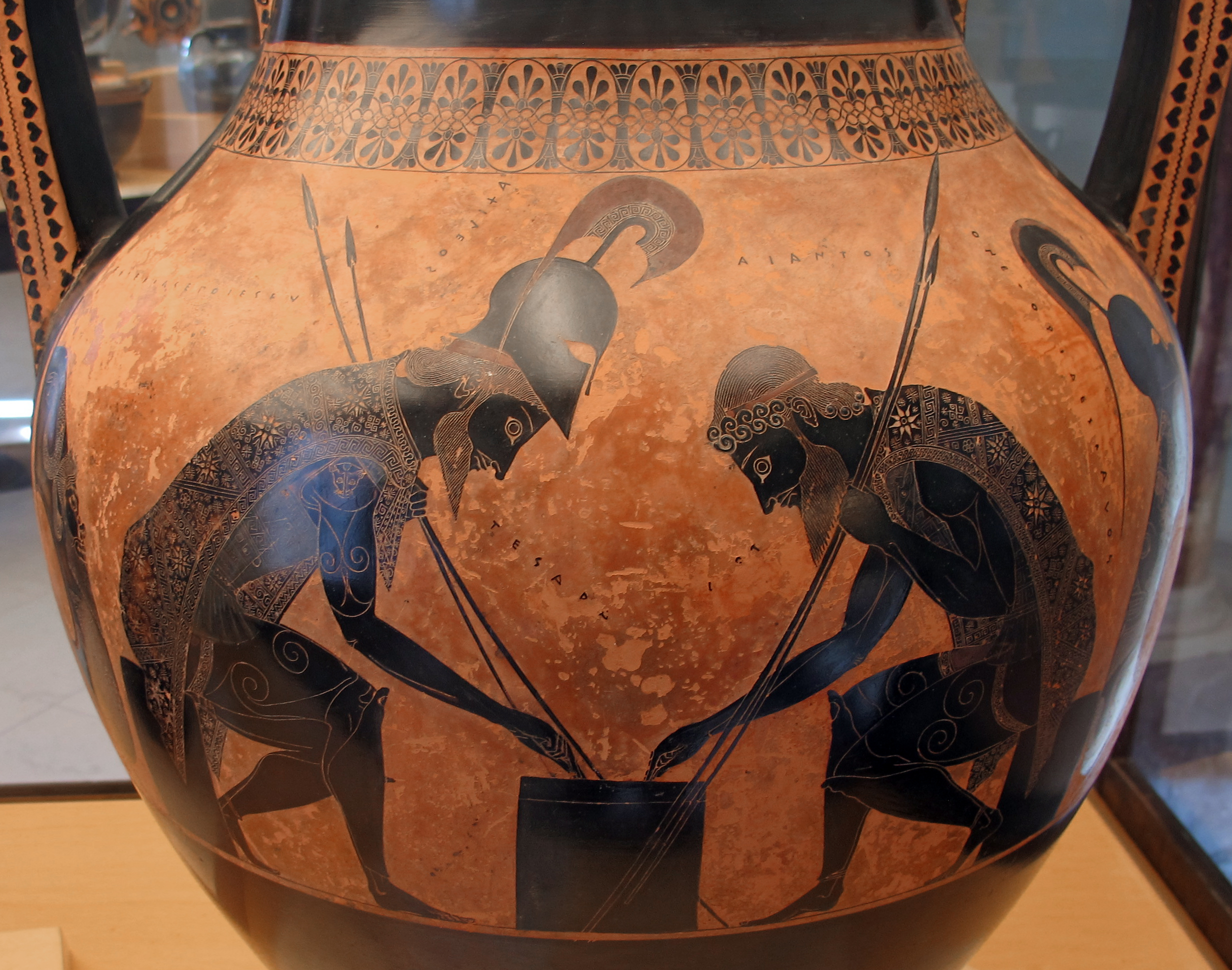
Amphora by Exekias, Achilles and Ajax engaged in a game, c. 540–530 BC, Vatican Museums, Vatican City

Another visual adaptation of the mythological past can be seen on the Vatican amphora 344, which is regarded by some art historians as Exekias' masterpiece. The Vatican amphora depicts Achilles and Ajax playing a board game, with both men identified by their names added in the genitive. Ajax and Achilles sit across from each other, looking down at a block situated between them. The board game they are playing, which might be compared to a backgammon or checkers variant, was played with a die. According to the words written next to the two players, Achilles proclaims he has thrown a four, while Ajax has a three. Although the two of them are pictured playing, they are clearly depicted as being on duty, accompanied by their body armor and holding their spears, suggesting that they might head back into battle at any moment. There are small details that Exekias adds to this piece that separate it from other depictions of this narrative. Achilles is shown with his helmet still resting on his head which represents he has more power than Ajax. Also, Ajax is shown with his heel slightly lifted, suggesting that he is nervous in the presence of Achilles. Apart from the selection of this very intimate, seemingly relaxed scene as a symbol for the Trojan War, this vase-painting also showcases the talent of Exekias as an artist: the figures of both Achilles and Ajax are decorated with fine incised details, showing elaborate textile patterns and almost every hair in place. There is no extant literary source that is known to have circulated in the sixth century BC in Athens regarding a narrative involving Ajax and Achilles playing a board game. Exekias may have drawn his inspiration for this innovative composition from local oral bardic traditions regarding the Trojan War, which may have developed during his lifetime in the cultural context of sixth century Athens. Despite the ambiguity surrounding the origin of this mythological narrative, Exekias' new depiction of Ajax and Achilles playing a board game was popular and was copied over 150 times in the ensuing fifty years.

The only "kalós" name used on vases attributed to or signed by Exekias as a painter is the Onētorídēs love name. The Onētorídēs love name appears on the Vatican 344 amphora, the London B 210 amphora, the Berlin F 1720 amphora, and the Athenian calyx-krater which has traditionally been attributed to Exekias. The Stēsías love name, Stēsías kalós, (Stesias [is] beautiful), is inscribed on the Louvre F 53 amphora, which Beazley attributed to the Group E phase of Exekias' artistic career.

== Composition ==
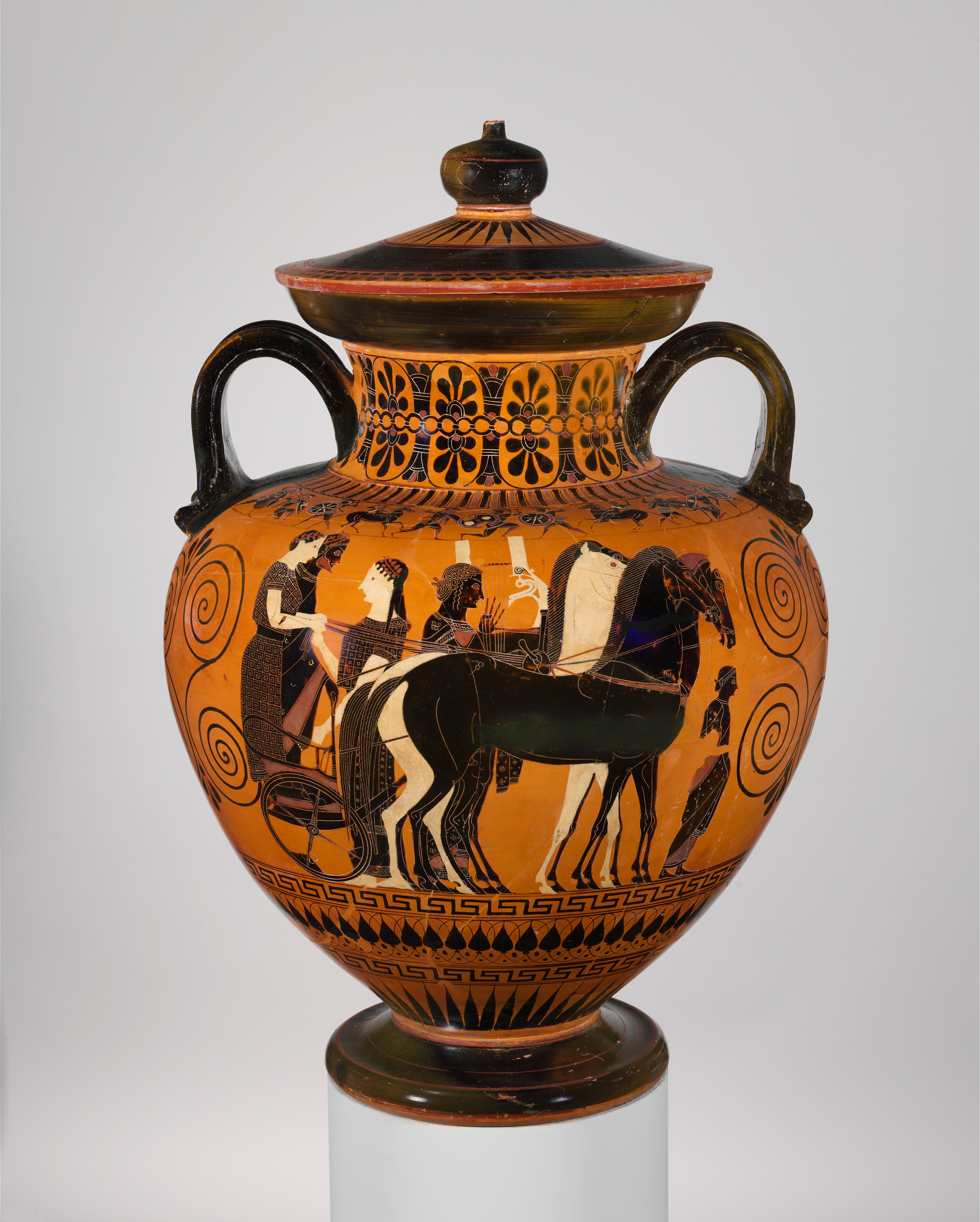
Terracotta neck-amphora with lid (ca. 540 BC); Metropolitan Museum of Art

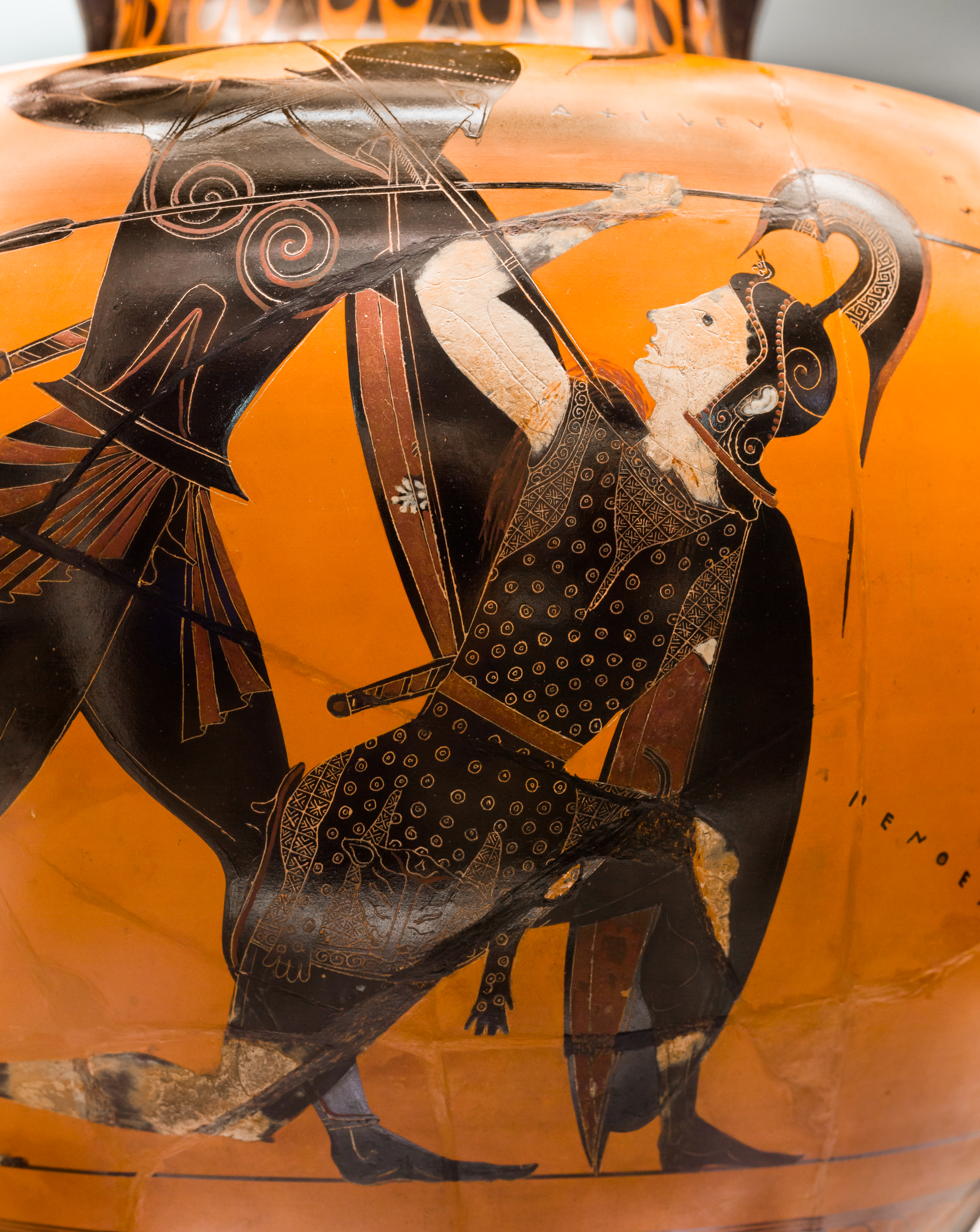
Death of Penthesileia, by the Athenian Black-Figure Master Exekias

In addition to the main tableau, in which figures interact physically and often with psychological import, there are often subordinate areas of interest on the vases of Exekias. Border decoration, and particularly large, beautifully constructed spirals with palmettes, frame and enliven the compositions. The central tableau is sometimes framed by areas of black, so that it appears suddenly out of the darkness, so to speak. Characteristically, Exekias uses the shape of the vessel, with its curving surface, as a terrain to which the lines and forms of the painting conform. As the viewer contemplates the vase, attention is drawn to the central scene: the game board (in the depiction of Achilles and Ajax Playing a Game), the face of Penthesilea (in the Death of Penthesilea), the starry robe of Dionysus, the sword implanted in the earth (in the Suicide of Ajax). On the rounded surface of the vase, this point is seen head on. All the other main lines of the composition either radiate around the thematic center or lead to it as the spokes of a wheel: the spears of the warriors, the curved backs of their hunching forms, the wind-filled sails of the ship and its curved bottom, the circle of dolphins. Other scenes are crowded with figures, such that attention is drawn toward the complex composition itself, or to individual men and women in a chariot or the magnificent horses arranged in groups. A variety of compositional devices are used to brilliant effect in the painting of Exekias, riveting the attention of the viewer, who then lingers to appreciate the finely executed forms and exquisite details.

== Line ==
Also characteristic of Exekias is his expert use of line, both in terms of his finely drawn figures and also his carefully incised detail—to delineate hair, beards, unique facial features, aspects of armor and furniture, traits of plants and animals, and particularly the patterns on woven or embroidered garments, which are impressively varied and spectacularly precise. This can be appreciated in the famous Vatican amphora (344), on which Achilles and Ajax are both shown wearing richly ornamented cloaks, with almost every element clearly visible and identifiable despite the small scale. Incised designs include rosettes of various types, swastikas with squared or rounded arms, stars, and loops, arranged in panels divided by bands of many types of geometric decoration. Musculature is deftly executed, as are details of hands, feet, and armor, and hair is precisely drawn with a series of lines that run exactly parallel and end in curls; the facial expressions of the two heroes are likewise perfectly accomplished, so as to indicate, within the conventions of black figure, the intense concentration as shown by the gaze of both players.

== See also ==
- Pottery of Ancient Greece
- Ancient Greek vase painters
