= Atas =

Trojan prince in Greek mythology

In Greek mythology, Atas (Ancient Greek: Ἄτας) was a Trojan prince, one of the sons of King Priam of Troy by an unknown woman.

== See also ==
- List of children of Priam
