= Democoon =

Greek mythological son of king Priam

In Greek mythology, Democoon (Ancient Greek: Δημοκόων, romanized: Dēmokóōnta) was a Trojan, son of king Priam mentioned in Homer's Iliad, Hyginus's Fabulae and the Bibliotheca. His mother's name is unknown. He was killed by Odysseus with a spear through the head.

== See also ==
- List of children of Priam
