= Idomeneus (mythology) =

Greek mythical character

In Greek mythology, Idomeneus (/aɪˈdɒmɪniəs/; Greek: Ἰδομενεύς) may refer to two different personages:

- Idomeneus, the Cretan leader during the Trojan War. He was the son of Deucalion, son of King Minos.
- Idomeneus, a Trojan prince as one of the sons of King Priam of Troy by an unknown woman.
