= Suicide of Ajax Vase =

Greek vase dated circa 6th-century BCE

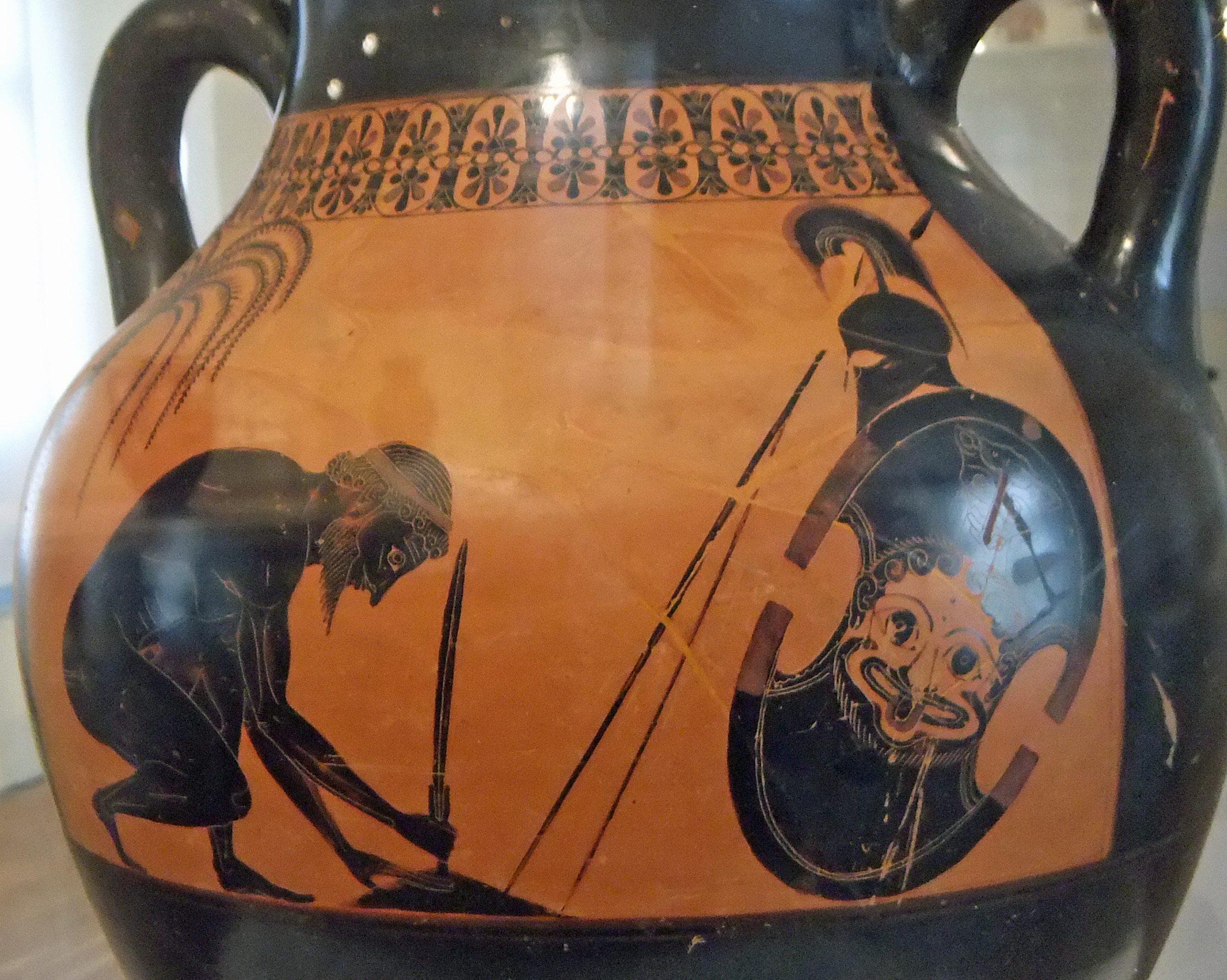
Suicide of Ajax, by the Black-Figure vase painter Exekias, ca. 540-530 BCE

The Suicide of Ajax Vase by the Black-Figure master Exekias depicts the suicide of Ajax is a neck amphora, painted in the black-figure style. It is now in the Château-musée de Boulogne-sur-Mer in France. The painter, Exekias, made this work in Athens at the end of the Archaic Period, around 540-530 BCE. The scene shows Ajax preparing for his suicide. Ajax appears in the middle, bent over his sword which he is placing in the ground. There is a tree to one side of him and his suit of armor (with his helmet facing the scene and a gorgoneion on his shield, looking out at the viewer) to the other side. There is a line of geometric decoration at the top of the scene and at the bottom of the amphora.

It was suggested by Jeffrey Hurwit that the tree is an example of "pathetic fallacy," though this idea was strongly contested by John Madden.

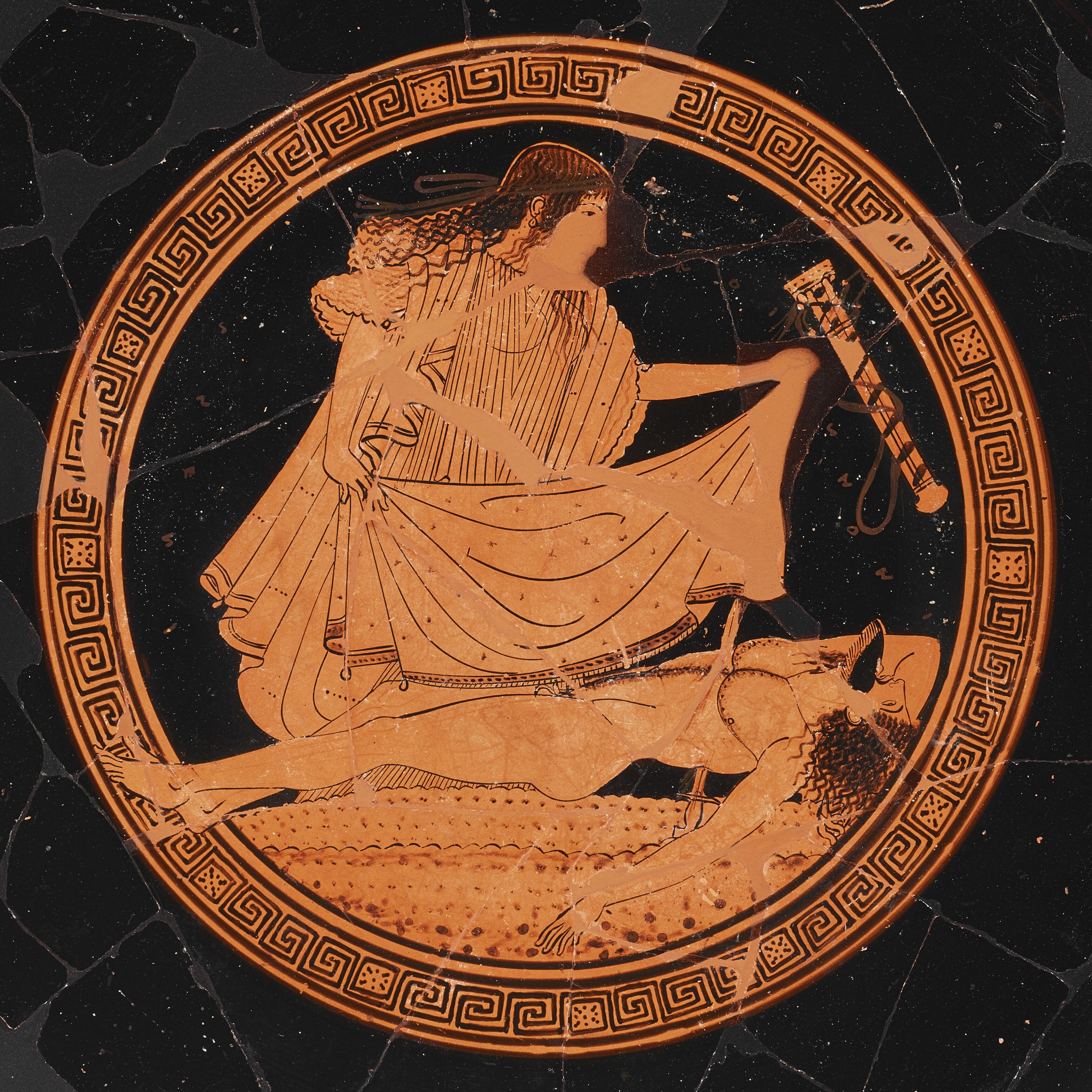
Suicide of Ajax by the red-figure Brygos Painter, Attic red-figure kylix (wine cup), ca. 490 BCE. Getty Museum (86.AE.286)

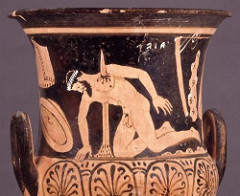
Suicide of Ajax, red-figure Etruscan calyx-krater, ca. 400-350 BCE. British Museum 1867,0508.1328.

While Exekias' version of the Suicide of Ajax is particularly well known, other examples of this scene, by other vase painters, also survive. These include a red-figure scene in a kylix (wine cup) attributed to the Brygos Painter (ca. 490 BCE) in the Getty Museum and a red-figure scene on an Etruscan calyx-krater (ca. 400-350 BCE) now in the British Museum.

== Exekias ==
Exekias was a well-known ancient Greek black-figure vase painter. His work commonly drew on scenes from the Trojan War. Ajax appears on his work more than any other Greek artist's work. Ajax was supposedly born on the island of Salamis, which is where Exekias is believed to be from. Some scholars infer that this connection is one of the reasons Exekias chooses to depict Ajax so often. Exekias is known for being able to show tension and emotion in scenes very well.

== Myth ==
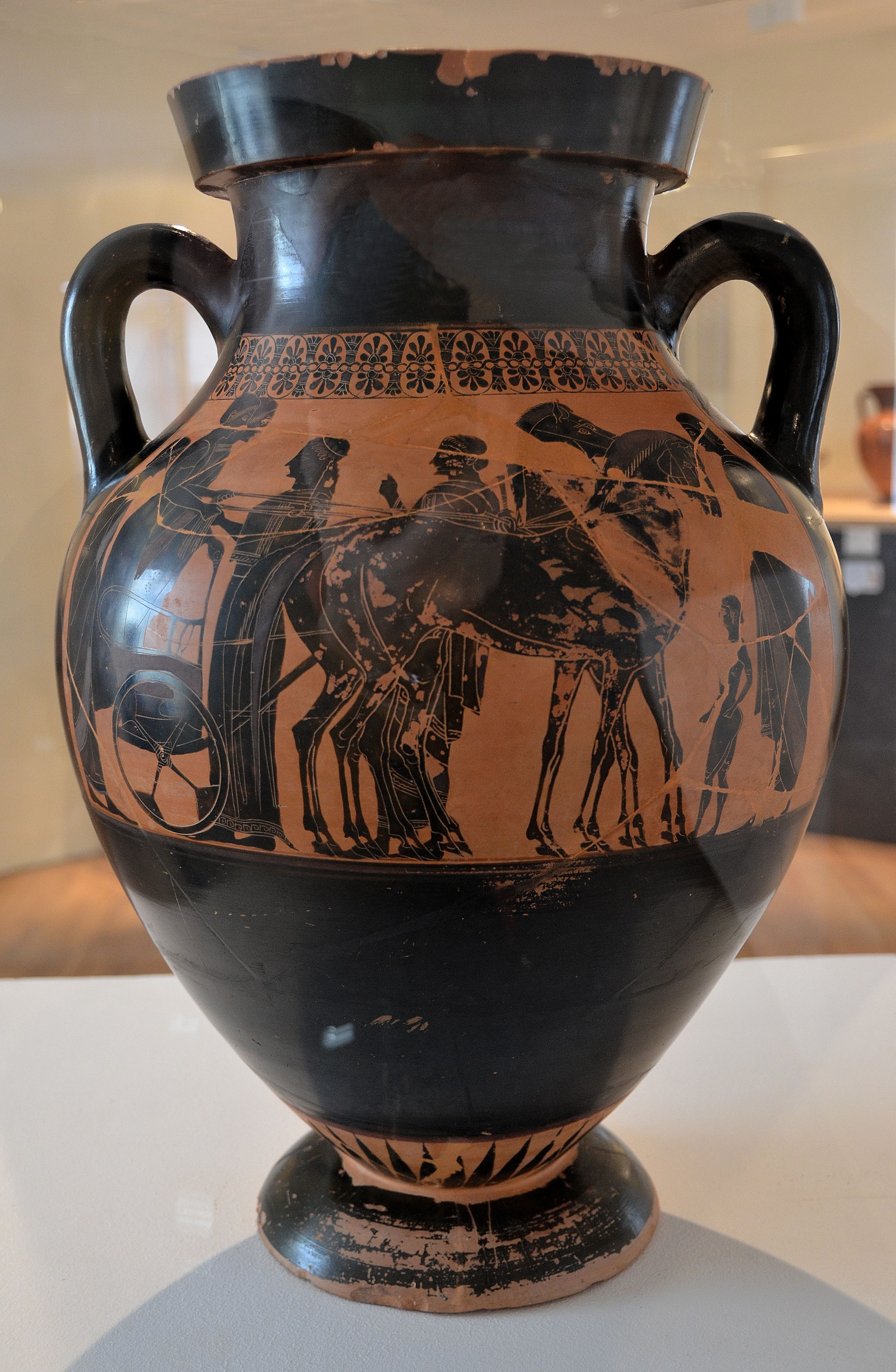
The other side of the vase

Ajax was considered the second-greatest hero at Troy, after his cousin Achilles. Once Achilles dies, Ajax and Odysseus debate over who should receive his armor. When Odysseus is given the armor, Ajax goes mad. He kills Greek cattle believing that it is the Greeks. Once he becomes aware of what he has done, he commits suicide. Ajax believes that after the cattle incident, killing himself is the only way to keep his status as a hero and to avoid bringing shame to his noble father Telamon.

== Details ==
Most scenes in Greek art are the climax of a story, such as battles and other active subjects. However, Exekias chooses to show Ajax preparing for his suicide, which no other known images of this event do. There are other representations of Ajax's suicide, including a Middle Protocorinthian aryballos, an Athenian ivory comb, and sixth century Corinthian vases. All of these show Ajax once he has already done the act of falling on his sword. Exekias shows Ajax planting his sword in the ground. He is nude, which shows his vulnerability in this moment. A single palm tree adds to the isolation of the scene.
