= Antinous (mythology) =

Name of several Greek myth figures

In Greek mythology, Antinous (also Antinoüs; Latin: Antinous) or Antinoös (Ancient Greek: Ἀντίνοος, romanized: Antínoös means "opposite in character, resisting") may refer to the following personages:

- Antinous, a Trojan prince as one of the sons of King Priam of Troy by an unknown woman.
- Antinous, son of Eupeithes and one of the Suitors of Penelope, wife of the hero Odysseus.
