= Deiphobus =

Mythical prince of Troy

Deiphobus attempting to kill Paris on an alabaster Etruscan funerary urn, Museo Guarnacci, Italy

In Greek mythology, Deiphobus (/diːˈɪfəbəs/; Ancient Greek: Δηΐφοβος, romanized: Dēḯphobos, lit. 'hostile', 'panicky flight' or 'dreaded by the enemy') was a son of Priam and Hecuba. He was a prince of Troy, and the greatest of Priam's sons after Hector. Deiphobus killed four men of fame in the Trojan War.

== Description ==
Hector, Aeneas and Deiphobus fighting Achilles for the body of Troilus. Black-figure amphora, c. 570 BC

Deiphobus was described by the chronicler Malalas in his account of the Chronography as " above average stature, keen-eyed, somewhat snub-nosed, dark-skinned, flat-faced, brave, good beard". Meanwhile, in the account of Dares the Phrygian, he was illustrated as ". . .looked like his father [i.e. a handsome face]. He was the man of forceful action".

== Mythology ==
Deiphobus was born to Priam and Hecuba after their sons Hector and Paris. He competed in the funeral games established for his brother Paris, who had been left on a mountainside as an infant. There, he and his siblings were defeated by a slave. Outraged, Deiphobus tried to kill him, until it was revealed this was actually Paris who had been saved by shepherds.

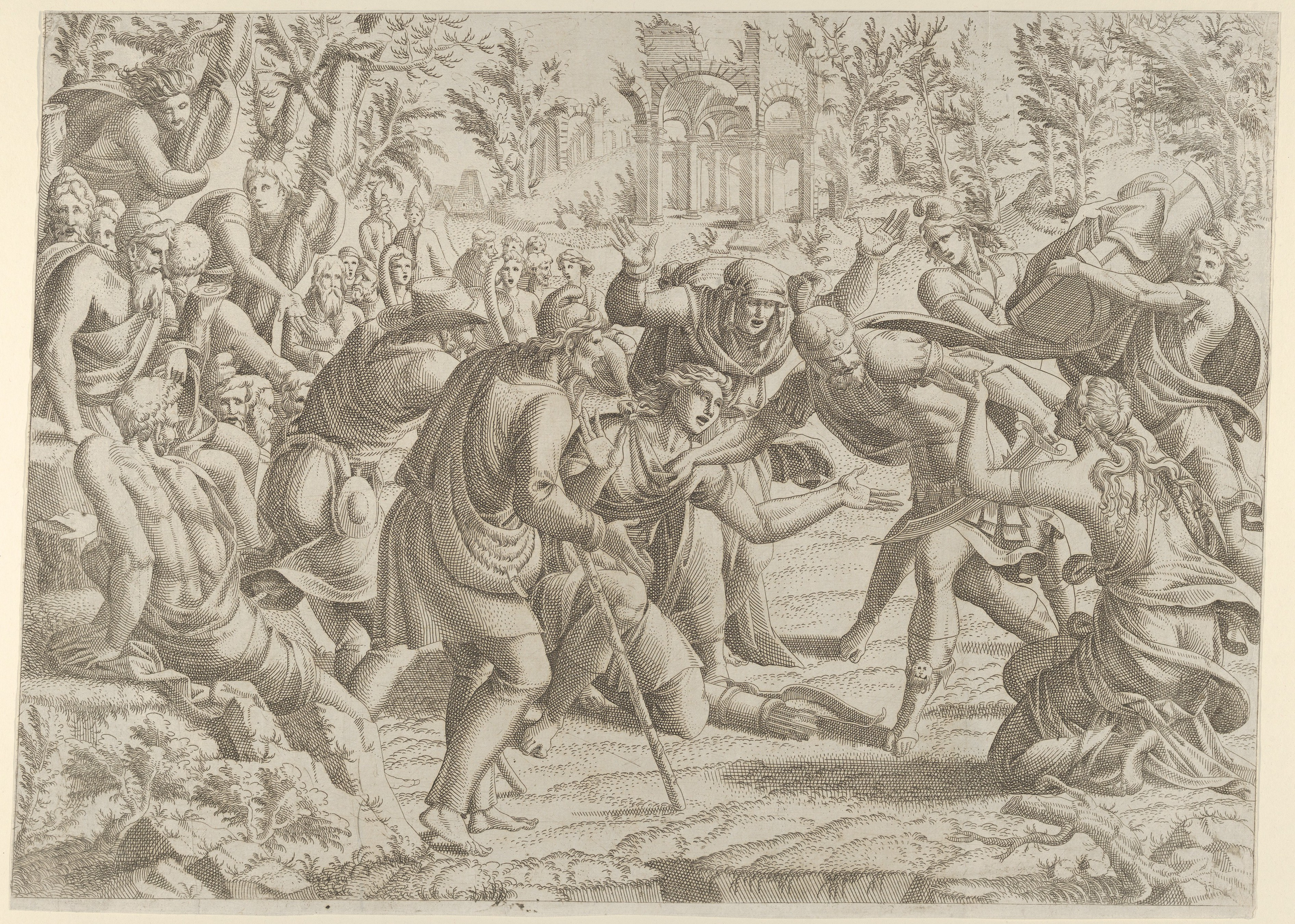
Cassandra stops Deiphobus from killing Paris. Etching by Jean Mignon after Luca Penni, c. 1540

According to the Iliad (books XII, XIV, XXII), in the Trojan War Deiphobus, along with his brother Helenus, led a group of soldiers at the siege of the newly constructed Argive wall and killed many, and wounded the Achaean hero Meriones. As Hector was fleeing Achilles, Athena took the shape of Deiphobus and goaded Hector to make a stand and fight. Hector, thinking it was his brother, listened and threw his spear at Achilles. When the spear missed, Hector turned around to ask his brother for another spear, but "Deiphobus" had vanished. He then looked around for him but he was nowhere to be seen. It was then Hector knew the gods had deceived and forsaken him, and he met his fate at the hand of Achilles.

Shade of Deiphobus in the underworld. Illustration by Anthony Rich, 1849

Some accounts, such as that of Dictys Cretensis, hold that it was Deiphobus and Paris who ambushed and killed Achilles while luring him to their sister Polyxena. After the death of Paris, Deiphobus was given Helen of Troy as a bride for his deeds in the war, defeating the bid of his other brother, Helenus. Euripides, in The Trojan Women, states that the marriage was by force and that Helen felt “bitterly enslaved.” When the Trojan Horse was in the city, Deiphobus accompanied Helen as she walked around the horse, calling out the names of the Greeks within in the voices of their wives. Menelaus and Odysseus had to restrain the men inside from responding. During the sack of Troy, Deiphobus was slain by either Odysseus or Menelaus, and his body was mutilated. Some accounts say it was Helen who killed him, or that she celebrated his death. Most accounts seem to indicate that, unlike her other two husbands, Helen didn't love Deiphobus and decided she would rather return to Menelaus.

In Virgil's Aeneid, Deiphobus, horribly mutilated during the sack of Troy, appears to Aeneas in the underworld. He tells him the story of his death, in which he entails Helen's betrayal in signaling Menelaus to Deiphobus's bedchamber. While with Aeneas, he begs the gods for revenge against the Greeks.

In an alternate account, Deiphobus was slain in battle by Palamedes, who in turn was shortly slain by Paris.

== Cultural depictions ==
- Deiphobus is a minor character in William Shakespeare's play Troilus and Cressida.
- One modern account, The Luck of Troy by Roger Lancelyn Green, depicts him as a particularly unpleasant character.
- In the Xena: Warrior Princess episode "Beware Greeks Bearing Gifts," Deiphobus is the primary villain, portrayed as betraying Troy and murdering Paris in order to win Helen for himself.

== Namesake ==
- 1867 Deiphobus, Trojan asteroid

== See also ==
- List of children of Priam
