= Anthony Rich =

Anthony Rich (1803 – 4 April 1891) was an English solicitor and author.

Educated at St Paul's School, London, he migrated to Gonville and Caius College, Cambridge aged 17 1821, and received a BA in 1825. He was admitted to Lincoln's Inn in 1824.

He wrote books on Dictionary of Greek and Roman Antiquities; The Illustrated Companion to the Latin Dictionary and Greek Lexicon; The Legend of St Peter's Chair; and The Satires of Horace with Illustrations from Roman Antiquities.

He was made an Honorary Fellow of Caius in 1886.

Rich was a supporter of Charles Darwin and became his benefactor, in particular helping to support Darwin's five sons William, Francis, George, Leonard and Horace. He also bequeathed his house to Thomas Huxley. In exchange, Darwin corresponded with him on scientific matters.

Rich died at Heene, Sussex.
