= Polites =

Disambiguation page

Polites is the name of two characters in Greek mythology of the Trojan War, and a genus of butterflies.

- Polites (friend of Odysseus) is a Greek warrior in the Iliad.
- Polites (prince of Troy) is a Trojan killed by Neoptolemus.

== Other use ==
- Polites (butterfly) is a genus of grass skipper butterflies
