= Paul of Perugia =

14th-century Italian mythographer

Paulus Perusinus or Pusinus was an Italian mythographer of the 14th century. He is extensively quoted in Giovanni Boccaccio's Genealogia Deorum Gentilium (Boccaccio mentions him as his source in XV, 6) but otherwise almost unknown. He was Head Librarian at the service of King Robert of Sicily and Jerusalem (Robert the Wise), a thorough investigator on foreign books, and a close friend of Barlaam of Seminara, Boccaccio's own master. He attributes Paul an extensive treatise entitled Collections, which was lost after his death. Boccaccio praises Paul's work, particularly when he quotes a certain Theodontius.
