= Laodice (daughter of Priam) =

Daughter of Priam and Hecuba

In Greek mythology, Laodice (/leɪˈɒdəˌsi/, [la.odíkɛː]; Ancient Greek: Λαοδίκη, romanized: Laodíkē, lit. 'people-justice') was the daughter of Priam of Troy and Hecuba. She was described as the most beautiful of Priam's daughters. The Iliad mentions Laodice as the wife of Helicaon, son of Antenor, although according to Hyginus she was the wife of Telephus, king of Mysia and son of Heracles.

== Mythology ==
Before the outbreak of the Trojan War, Laodice fell in love with Acamas, son of Theseus, who had come to Troy to try to recover Helen through diplomatic means. She became pregnant and bore him the son Munitus. The later was given to Acamas' grandmother Aethra, who was then a slave to Helen. After the war had ended, Acamas took his son with him. Much later, Munitus was bitten by a snake while hunting with his father in Thrace and died. According to another account, Laodice instead had a son, Munychus, by Acamas' brother Demophoon.

According to the Bibliotheca and several other sources, in the night of the fall of Troy Laodice feared she might become one of the captive women and prayed to the gods. She was swallowed up in a chasm that opened on the earth.

Pausanias, however, mentions her among the captive Trojans painted in the Lesche of Delphi. He assumes that she was subsequently set free because no poet mentions her as a captive, and he further surmises that the Greeks would have done her no harm, since she was married to a son of Antenor, who was a guest-friend of the Greeks Menelaus and Odysseus.
