= Cebriones =

Son of Priam in Greek mythology

Black-figure artwork on an Athenian wine-jug, depicting Cebriones mounting Hector's chariot

In Greek mythology, Cebriones (Ancient Greek: Κεβριόνης, Kebriones) was the illegitimate son of King Priam of Troy and a slave.

== Mythology ==
He might have had some sort of connection with the Cebren River. Strabo suggests that Cebriones may the namesake of the region of Cebrenia and its city, as well as the Cebreni people.

In the Iliad, he was the half-brother of Hector and his final charioteer during the Trojan War. Along with Hector and Paris, he was part of the division that finally breached the Argive wall. Patroclus, the Achaean warrior, killed him by throwing a "shining stone," hitting him in the forehead and knocking his eyes out of his head. The force of the blow flung him from Hector's chariot, leading Patroclus to remark that with his great "diving" ability, he could have satisfied many by diving for oysters in the "storming sea".

Cebriones was also the name of a giant featured in the Gigantomachy and mentioned in Artistophanes' play The Birds.

== See also ==
- List of children of Priam
