= Crethon =

In Greek mythology, Crethon (Ancient Greek: Κρήθωνά or Κρήθων, romanized: Krethōn) was an Achaean warrior, from Pharae in Messenia, who participated in the Trojan War.

== Family ==
Crethon was the son of Diocles and twin brother of Orsilochus. His sister was Anticleia, mother of Nicomachus and Gorgasus by Machaon.

== Mythology ==
Crethon and Orsilochus were killed by the Trojan hero Aeneas during the siege of Troy.

Then Aeneas slew two champions of the Danaans, the sons of Diocles, Crethon and Orsilochus, whose father dwelt in well-built Pherae, a man rich in substance, and in lineage was he sprung from the river Alpheius that flows in broad stream through the land of the Pylians, and that begat Orsilochus to be king over many men. And Orsilochus begat greatsouled Diocles, and of Diocles were born twin sons, Crethon and Orsilochus, well skilled in all manner of fighting. Now when the twain had reached manhood, they followed with the Argives on the black ships to Ilios famed for its horses, seeking to win recompense for the sons of Atreus, Agamemnon and Menelaus; but their own selves in that land did the doom of death enfold. Like them two lions upon the mountain tops are reared by their dam in the thickets of a deep wood; and the twain snatch cattle and goodly sheep and make havoc of the farmsteads of men, until themselves are slain by the hands of men with the sharp bronze; even in such wise were these twain vanquished beneath the hands of Aeneas, and fell like tall fir-trees.
