= Orsilochus =

Name from Greek mythology

In Greek mythology, Orsilochus or Orsilocus (Ancient Greek: Ὀρσίλοχος, romanized: Orsílochos, lit. 'one who stirs up or urges on an ambush' or 'eager for battle/ ambush'), also Ortilochus (Ancient Greek: Ὀρτίλοχος), is a name that may refer to:

- Orsilochus, son of the river god Alpheus and Telegone, daughter of Pharis. He was a resident of Pherae and its king after succeeding his grandfather to the throne. It was at his home that Odysseus met Iphitos the son of Eurytus. Orsilochus had at least one son Diocles, his successor, and at least two daughters: Dorodoche, said by some to be the wife of Icarius, and Medusa, the wife of Polybus of Corinth.
- Orsilochus, grandson of the precedent through Diocles, and twin of Crethon. He was the brother of Anticleia. These men fought at Troy under Agamemnon and were killed by Aeneas.
- Orsilochus, a Trojan soldier who was shot dead by the Greek hero, Teucer, during the Trojan War.
- Orsilochus, another Trojan who followed Aeneas to Italy and was killed by Camilla.
- Orsilochus of Argos, who was credited with inventing the four-horse chariot, and, in reward for his invention, was placed among the stars as the constellation Auriga. See also Trochilus.
- Orsilochus, a (perhaps imaginary) son of King Idomeneus of Crete and scion of Minos, renowned as a great runner and the fastest man on Crete, who only appears in a story made up by Odysseus, see below.
- Orsilochus of Crete was mentioned in Book 13 of Homer's Odyssey, when Odysseus makes use of his little-known status in Ithaca to construct an elaborate lie for the benefit of the disguised and fully cognisant Pallas Athena, claiming that he had killed him: "He tried to fleece me of all the booty I had won at Troy, my reward for the long-drawn agonies of war and all the miseries of voyages by sea, merely because I refused to obey his father and serve under him at Troy, and preferred to lead my own command. So, with a friend at my side, I laid an intense ambush for him at the side of the road, and struck him with my bronze spear as he was coming in from the country. There was a pitch-black sky that night covering the heavens, and not a soul saw us; so no-one knew that it was I who had killed him."

== Modern references ==
- The asteroids 5284 Orsilocus and 5285 Krethon were named after Orsilochus and Crethon, the sons of Diocles, respectively.
- Orsilochus (millipede), a genus of millipedes in the family Siphonotidae
