= Pharis (mythology) =

Son of Hermes and the Danaid Phylodameia

In Greek mythology, Pharis (Ancient Greek: Φᾶρις, romanized: Pháris) was the son of Hermes and the Danaid Phylodámeia (Φυλοδάμεια), and founder of Pharae in Messene.

== Family ==
Pharis had one daughter, Telegone, who consorted with the river god Alpheius and had by him a son Ortilochus (Orsilochus), who in his turn became father of Diocles, and Diocles had twin sons Crethon and Orsilochus, who fought at Troy and were killed by Aeneas.

== Mythology ==
Pausanias leaves open the question whether Pharae in Achaea were founded by this Pharis—spelled Pháres (Φάρην) in this particular passage—or by someone else.
