= Medusa (mythology) =

Mythological figures

In Greek mythology, Medusa (/mɪˈdjuːzə, -sə/; Ancient Greek: Μέδουσα, romanized: Médousa or Medousa) may refer to the following personages:

- Medusa, one of the Gorgons.
- Medusa, one of the Hesperides and the sister of Aegle, Hesperie and Arethusa.
- Medusa, a Mycenaean princess as the daughter of King Sthenelus and Queen Nicippe (also called Antibia or Archippe), daughter of Pelops. She was the sister of Eurystheus and Alcyone. Also called Astymedusa, she became the second wife of Oedipus after the death of Jocasta.
- Medusa, a Trojan princess as daughter of King Priam.
- Medusa, a princess of Iolcus as daughter of King Pelias and Queen Anaxibia, daughter of Bias.
- Medusa, a resident of Pherae and daughter of Orsilochus. She was probably the sister of Diocles and Dorodoche, said by some to be the wife of Icarius. Medusa married Polybus, king of Corinth and thus, adopted mother of Oedipus.
