= Telegone (mythology) =

In Greek mythology, Telegone (Ancient Greek: Τηλεγόνην) was the daughter of Pharis, son of Hermes and the Danaid Phylodameia. She bore to the river-god Alpheus, a son, Orsilochus who later became the father of Diocles. The latter's children, Orsilochus and Crethon, fought in the Trojan War and were killed by Aeneas.
