= Pharae (disambiguation) =

Pharae (Ancient Greek: Φαραί) is an ancient city of Achaea.

Pharae may also refer to:

- Pharae (Boeotia), an ancient city of Boeotia
- Pharae (Crete), an ancient city of Crete
- Pharae (Laconia), an ancient city of Laconia
- Pharae (Messenia), an ancient city of Messenia

== See also ==
- Pherae, an ancient city of Thessaly
