= Gorgasus (mythology) =

In Greek mythology, Gorgasus (Ancient Greek: Γόργασος, romanized: Gorgasos) was a king of Pherae in Messenia.

== Family ==
Gorgasus was the son of Machaon, the son of Asclepius, and Anticleia, the daughter of King Diocles of Pherae. His brother was called Nicomachus.

== Mythology ==
After the death of his grandfather, Gorgasus succeeded to the kingdom. He also followed the example of his father, by practicing the art of healing, for which he received divine honors after his death.

Gorgagus and Nicomachus had a sanctuary at Pherae, founded by Glaucus, the son of Aepytus.
