= 5284 Orsilocus =

Trojan asteroid

Discovery
- Discovered by: C. S. Shoemaker; E. M. Shoemaker
- Discovery site: Palomar Obs.
- Discovery date: 1 February 1989

Designations
- Pronunciation: /ɔːrˈsɪləkəs/
- Named after: Orsilochus (Orsilocus) (Greek mythology)
- Alternative designations: 1989 CK_{2}
- Minor planet category: Jupiter trojan Greek · background
- Adjectives: Orsilocian

Orbital characteristics
- Epoch 23 March 2018 (JD 2458200.5)
- Uncertainty parameter 0
- Observation arc: 65.27 yr (23,840 d)
- Aphelion: 5.6580 AU
- Perihelion: 4.7937 AU
- Semi-major axis: 5.2259 AU
- Eccentricity: 0.0827
- Orbital period (sidereal): 11.95 yr (4,364 d)
- Mean anomaly: 203.67°
- Mean motion: 0° 4^{m} 57^{s} / day
- Inclination: 20.225°
- Longitude of ascending node: 102.75°
- Argument of perihelion: 343.29°
- Jupiter MOID: 0.3804 AU
- T_{Jupiter}: 2.8700

Physical characteristics
- Mean diameter: 50.16±0.46 km 53.16 km (calculated)
- Synodic rotation period: 10.31±0.01 h (Note: Lightcurve plot of (5284) Orsilocus from Feb 2013, May 2015 and May 2016 by Robert Stephens at the Center for Solar System Studies (U81). Quality code is n.a./2+/2+ (lightcurve rating at CS3). Summary figures at the LCDB and CS3.)
- Geometric albedo: 0.057 (assumed); 0.070±0.009
- Spectral type: D (Pan-STARRS); D (SDSS-MOC); V–I = 0.970±0.047
- Absolute magnitude (H): 10.0; 10.1; 10.28±0.24

5284 Orsilocus /ɔːrˈsɪləkəs/ is a Jupiter trojan from the Greek camp, approximately 50 kilometers (31 miles) in diameter. It was discovered on 1 February 1989, by American astronomers Carolyn and Eugene Shoemaker at the Palomar Observatory in California. The D-type asteroid belongs the 100 largest Jupiter trojans and has a rotation period of 10.3 hours. It was named after the hero Orsilochus (Orsilocus) from Greek mythology.

== Orbit and classification ==
Orsilocus is a dark Jovian asteroid orbiting in the leading Greek camp at Jupiter's L_{4} Lagrangian point, 60° ahead of the Gas Giant's orbit in a 1:1 resonance. It is also a non-family asteroid in the Jovian background population.

It orbits the Sun at a distance of 4.8–5.7 AU once every 11 years and 11 months (4,364 days; semi-major axis of 5.23 AU). Its orbit has an eccentricity of 0.08 and an inclination of 20° with respect to the ecliptic. The body's observation arc begins with a precovery at Palomar in February 1953, or 36 years prior to its official discovery observation.

== Physical characteristics ==
In the SDSS-based taxonomy, Orsilocus is a D-type asteroid, the most common spectral type among the larger Jupiter trojans. It has also been characterized as a D-type by Pan-STARRS' survey, while the Collaborative Asteroid Lightcurve Link (CALL) assumes it to be a carbonaceous C-type asteroid. Its V–I color index of 0.97 is typical for most larger Jovian asteroids.

=== Rotation period ===
In February 2013, a rotational lightcurve of Orsilocus was obtained from photometric observations by Robert Stephens at the Center for Solar System Studies (CS3) in Landers, California. Lightcurve analysis gave a rotation period of 10.31±0.01 hours with a variation amplitude of 0.12 magnitude (U=2+).

In 2015 and 2016, follow-up observations by Stephens at the CS3 gave two concurring periods of 10.28±0.01 and 10.36±0.03 hours with an amplitude of 0.20 and 0.16 magnitude, respectively (U=2+/2+).

=== Diameter and albedo ===
According to the survey carried out by the NEOWISE mission of NASA's Wide-field Infrared Survey Explorer, Orsilocus measures 50.16 kilometers in diameter and its surface has an albedo of 0.070, while CALL assumes a standard albedo for a carbonaceous asteroid of 0.057, and calculates a diameter of 53.16 kilometers based on an absolute magnitude of 10.1.

100+ largest Jupiter trojans

Largest Jupiter Trojans by survey^{(A)} (mean-diameter in kilometers; RP: rotation period in hours; YoD: Year of Discovery)
| Designation | H | WISE | IRAS | Akari | Ln | RP | V–I | YoD | Ref |
|---|---|---|---|---|---|---|---|---|---|
| 624 Hektor | 7.2 | 225 | 233 | 230.99 | L4 | 6.92 | 0.930 | 1907 | list |
| 617 Patroclus | 8.19 | 140.362 | 140.92 | 140.85 | L5 | 102.80 | 0.830 | 1906 | list |
| 911 Agamemnon | 7.89 | 131.038 | 166.66 | 185.30 | L4 | 6.59 | 0.980 | 1919 | list |
| 588 Achilles | 8.67 | 130.099 | 135.47 | 133.22 | L4 | 7.31 | 0.940 | 1906 | list |
| 3451 Mentor | 8.4 | 126.288 | 116.30 | 117.91 | L5 | 7.70 | 0.770 | 1984 | list |
| 3317 Paris | 8.3 | 118.790 | 116.26 | 120.45 | L5 | 7.09 | 0.950 | 1984 | list |
| 1867 Deiphobus | 8.3 | 118.220 | 122.67 | 131.31 | L5 | 58.66 | 0.930 | 1971 | list |
| 1172 Äneas | 8.33 | 118.020 | 142.82 | 148.66 | L5 | 8.71 | 0.950 | 1930 | list |
| 1437 Diomedes | 8.3 | 117.786 | 164.31 | 172.60 | L4 | 24.49 | 0.810 | 1937 | list |
| 1143 Odysseus | 7.93 | 114.624 | 125.64 | 130.81 | L4 | 10.11 | 0.860 | 1930 | list |
| 2241 Alcathous | 8.64 | 113.682 | 114.63 | 118.87 | L5 | 7.69 | 0.940 | 1979 | list |
| 659 Nestor | 8.99 | 112.320 | 108.87 | 107.06 | L4 | 15.98 | 0.790 | 1908 | list |
| 3793 Leonteus | 8.7 | 112.046 | 86.26 | 87.58 | L4 | 5.62 | 0.780 | 1985 | list |
| 3063 Makhaon | 8.4 | 111.655 | 116.14 | 114.34 | L4 | 8.64 | 0.830 | 1983 | list |
| 1583 Antilochus | 8.6 | 108.842 | 101.62 | 111.69 | L4 | 31.54 | 0.950 | 1950 | list |
| 884 Priamus | 8.81 | 101.093 | 96.29 | 119.99 | L5 | 6.86 | 0.900 | 1917 | list |
| 1208 Troilus | 8.99 | 100.477 | 103.34 | 111.36 | L5 | 56.17 | 0.740 | 1931 | list |
| 1173 Anchises | 8.89 | 99.549 | 126.27 | 120.49 | L5 | 11.60 | 0.780 | 1930 | list |
| 2207 Antenor | 8.89 | 97.658 | 85.11 | 91.32 | L5 | 7.97 | 0.950 | 1977 | list |
| 2363 Cebriones | 9.11 | 95.976 | 81.84 | 84.61 | L5 | 20.05 | 0.910 | 1977 | list |
| 4063 Euforbo | 8.7 | 95.619 | 102.46 | 106.38 | L4 | 8.85 | 0.950 | 1989 | list |
| 2357 Phereclos | 8.94 | 94.625 | 94.90 | 98.45 | L5 | 14.39 | 0.960 | 1981 | list |
| 4709 Ennomos | 8.5 | 91.433 | 80.85 | 80.03 | L5 | 12.28 | 0.690 | 1988 | list |
| 2797 Teucer | 8.7 | 89.430 | 111.14 | 113.99 | L4 | 10.15 | 0.920 | 1981 | list |
| 2920 Automedon | 8.8 | 88.574 | 111.01 | 113.11 | L4 | 10.21 | 0.950 | 1981 | list |
| 15436 Dexius | 9.1 | 87.646 | 85.71 | 78.63 | L4 | 8.97 | 0.870 | 1998 | list |
| 3596 Meriones | 9.2 | 87.380 | 75.09 | 73.28 | L4 | 12.96 | 0.830 | 1985 | list |
| 2893 Peiroos | 9.23 | 86.884 | 87.46 | 86.76 | L5 | 8.96 | 0.950 | 1975 | list |
| 4086 Podalirius | 9.1 | 85.495 | 86.89 | 85.98 | L4 | 10.43 | 0.870 | 1985 | list |
| 4060 Deipylos | 9.3 | 84.043 | 79.21 | 86.79 | L4 | 9.30 | 0.760 | 1987 | list |
| 1404 Ajax | 9.3 | 83.990 | 81.69 | 96.34 | L4 | 29.38 | 0.960 | 1936 | list |
| 4348 Poulydamas | 9.5 | 82.032 | 70.08 | 87.51 | L5 | 9.91 | 0.840 | 1988 | list |
| 5144 Achates | 9.0 | 80.958 | 91.91 | 89.85 | L5 | 5.96 | 0.920 | 1991 | list |
| 4833 Meges | 8.9 | 80.165 | 87.33 | 89.39 | L4 | 14.25 | 0.940 | 1989 | list |
| 2223 Sarpedon | 9.41 | 77.480 | 94.63 | 108.21 | L5 | 22.74 | 0.880 | 1977 | list |
| 4489 Dracius | 9.0 | 76.595 | 92.93 | 95.02 | L4 | 12.58 | 0.950 | 1988 | list |
| 2260 Neoptolemus | 9.31 | 76.435 | 71.65 | 81.28 | L4 | 8.18 | 0.950 | 1975 | list |
| 5254 Ulysses | 9.2 | 76.147 | 78.34 | 80.00 | L4 | 28.72 | 0.970 | 1986 | list |
| 3708 Socus | 9.3 | 75.661 | 79.59 | 76.75 | L5 | 6.55 | 0.980 | 1974 | list |
| 2674 Pandarus | 9.1 | 74.267 | 98.10 | 101.72 | L5 | 8.48 | 1.000 | 1982 | list |
| 3564 Talthybius | 9.4 | 73.730 | 68.92 | 74.11 | L4 | 40.59 | 0.900 | 1985 | list |
| 4834 Thoas | 9.1 | 72.331 | 86.82 | 96.21 | L4 | 18.19 | 0.950 | 1989 | list |
| 7641 Cteatus | 9.4 | 71.839 | 68.97 | 75.28 | L4 | 27.77 | 0.980 | 1986 | list |
| 3540 Protesilaos | 9.3 | 70.225 | 76.84 | 87.66 | L4 | 8.95 | 0.940 | 1973 | list |
| 11395 Iphinous | 9.8 | 68.977 | 64.71 | 67.78 | L4 | 17.38 | – | 1998 | list |
| 4035 Thestor | 9.6 | 68.733 | 68.23 | 66.99 | L4 | 13.47 | 0.970 | 1986 | list |
| 5264 Telephus | 9.4 | 68.472 | 73.26 | 81.38 | L4 | 9.53 | 0.970 | 1991 | list |
| 1868 Thersites | 9.5 | 68.163 | 70.08 | 78.89 | L4 | 10.48 | 0.960 | 1960 | list |
| 9799 Thronium | 9.6 | 68.033 | 64.87 | 72.42 | L4 | 21.52 | 0.910 | 1996 | list |
| 4068 Menestheus | 9.5 | 67.625 | 62.37 | 68.46 | L4 | 14.40 | 0.950 | 1973 | list |
| 23135 Pheidas | 9.9 | 66.230 | 58.29 | 68.50 | L4 | 8.69 | 0.860 | 2000 | list |
| 2456 Palamedes | 9.3 | 65.916 | 91.66 | 99.60 | L4 | 7.24 | 0.920 | 1966 | list |
| 3709 Polypoites | 9.1 | 65.297 | 99.09 | 85.23 | L4 | 10.04 | 1.000 | 1985 | list |
| 1749 Telamon | 9.5 | 64.898 | 81.06 | 69.14 | L4 | 16.98 | 0.970 | 1949 | list |
| 3548 Eurybates | 9.6 | 63.885 | 72.14 | 68.40 | L4 | 8.71 | 0.730 | 1973 | list |
| 4543 Phoinix | 9.7 | 63.836 | 62.79 | 69.54 | L4 | 38.87 | 1.200 | 1989 | list |
| 12444 Prothoon | 9.8 | 63.835 | 64.31 | 62.41 | L5 | 15.82 | – | 1996 | list |
| 4836 Medon | 9.5 | 63.277 | 67.73 | 78.70 | L4 | 9.82 | 0.920 | 1989 | list |
| 16070 Charops | 9.7 | 63.191 | 64.13 | 68.98 | L5 | 20.24 | 0.960 | 1999 | list |
| 15440 Eioneus | 9.6 | 62.519 | 66.48 | 71.88 | L4 | 21.43 | 0.970 | 1998 | list |
| 4715 Medesicaste | 9.7 | 62.097 | 63.91 | 65.93 | L5 | 8.81 | 0.850 | 1989 | list |
| 34746 Thoon | 9.8 | 61.684 | 60.51 | 63.63 | L5 | 19.63 | 0.950 | 2001 | list |
| 38050 Bias | 9.8 | 61.603 | 61.04 | 50.44 | L4 | 18.85 | 0.990 | 1998 | list |
| 5130 Ilioneus | 9.7 | 60.711 | 59.40 | 52.49 | L5 | 14.77 | 0.960 | 1989 | list |
| 5027 Androgeos | 9.6 | 59.786 | 57.86 | n.a. | L4 | 11.38 | 0.910 | 1988 | list |
| 6090 Aulis | 9.4 | 59.568 | 74.53 | 81.92 | L4 | 18.48 | 0.980 | 1989 | list |
| 5648 Axius | 9.7 | 59.295 | 63.91 | n.a. | L5 | 37.56 | 0.900 | 1990 | list |
| 7119 Hiera | 9.7 | 59.150 | 76.40 | 77.29 | L4 | 400 | 0.950 | 1989 | list |
| 4805 Asteropaios | 10.0 | 57.647 | 53.16 | 43.44 | L5 | 12.37 | – | 1990 | list |
| 16974 Iphthime | 9.8 | 57.341 | 55.43 | 57.15 | L4 | 78.9 | 0.960 | 1998 | list |
| 4867 Polites | 9.8 | 57.251 | 58.29 | 64.29 | L5 | 11.24 | 1.010 | 1989 | list |
| 2895 Memnon | 10.0 | 56.706 | 55.67 | n.a. | L5 | 7.50 | 0.710 | 1981 | list |
| 4708 Polydoros | 9.9 | 54.964 | 55.67 | n.a. | L5 | 7.52 | 0.960 | 1988 | list |
| 21601 Aias | 10.0 | 54.909 | 55.67 | 56.08 | L4 | 12.65 | 0.970 | 1998 | list |
| 12929 Periboea | 9.9 | 54.077 | 61.04 | 55.34 | L5 | 9.27 | 0.880 | 1999 | list |
| 17492 Hippasos | 10.0 | 53.975 | 55.67 | n.a. | L5 | 17.75 | – | 1991 | list |
| 5652 Amphimachus | 10.1 | 53.921 | 53.16 | 52.48 | L4 | 8.37 | 1.050 | 1992 | list |
| 2759 Idomeneus | 9.9 | 53.676 | 61.01 | 52.55 | L4 | 32.38 | 0.910 | 1980 | list |
| 5258 Rhoeo | 10.2 | 53.275 | 50.77 | n.a. | L4 | 19.85 | 1.010 | 1989 | list |
| 12126 Chersidamas | 10.1 | 53.202 | n.a. | n.a. | L5 | n.a. | ? | 1999 | list |
| 15502 Hypeirochus | 10.0 | 53.100 | 55.67 | 50.86 | L5 | 15.13 | 0.875 | 1999 | list |
| 4754 Panthoos | 10.0 | 53.025 | 53.15 | 56.96 | L5 | 27.68 | – | 1977 | list |
| 4832 Palinurus | 10.0 | 52.058 | 53.16 | n.a. | L5 | 5.32 | 1.000 | 1988 | list |
| 5126 Achaemenides | 10.5 | 51.922 | 44.22 | 48.57 | L4 | 53.02 | – | 1989 | list |
| 3240 Laocoon | 10.2 | 51.695 | 50.77 | n.a. | L5 | 11.31 | 0.880 | 1978 | list |
| 4902 Thessandrus | 9.8 | 51.263 | 61.04 | 71.79 | L4 | 738 | 0.960 | 1989 | list |
| 11552 Boucolion | 10.1 | 51.136 | 53.16 | 53.91 | L5 | 32.44 | – | 1993 | list |
| 20729 Opheltius | 10.4 | 50.961 | 46.30 | n.a. | L4 | 5.72 | 1.000 | 1999 | list |
| 6545 Leitus | 10.1 | 50.951 | 53.16 | n.a. | L4 | 16.26 | 0.910 | 1986 | list |
| 4792 Lykaon | 10.1 | 50.870 | 53.16 | n.a. | L5 | 40.09 | 0.960 | 1988 | list |
| 21900 Orus | 10.0 | 50.810 | 55.67 | 53.87 | L4 | 13.45 | 0.950 | 1999 | list |
| 1873 Agenor | 10.1 | 50.799 | 53.76 | 54.38 | L5 | 20.60 | – | 1971 | list |
| 5028 Halaesus | 10.2 | 50.770 | 50.77 | n.a. | L4 | 24.94 | 0.900 | 1988 | list |
| 2146 Stentor | 9.9 | 50.755 | 58.29 | n.a. | L4 | 16.40 | – | 1976 | list |
| 4722 Agelaos | 10.0 | 50.378 | 53.16 | 59.47 | L5 | 18.44 | 0.910 | 1977 | list |
| 5284 Orsilocus | 10.1 | 50.159 | 53.16 | n.a. | L4 | 10.31 | 0.970 | 1989 | list |
| 11509 Thersilochos | 10.1 | 49.960 | 53.16 | 56.23 | L5 | 17.37 | – | 1990 | list |
| 5285 Krethon | 10.1 | 49.606 | 58.53 | 52.61 | L4 | 12.04 | 1.090 | 1989 | list |
| 4791 Iphidamas | 10.1 | 49.528 | 57.85 | 59.96 | L5 | 9.70 | 1.030 | 1988 | list |
| 9023 Mnesthus | 10.1 | 49.151 | 50.77 | 60.80 | L5 | 30.66 | – | 1988 | list |
| 5283 Pyrrhus | 9.7 | 48.356 | 64.58 | 69.93 | L4 | 7.32 | 0.950 | 1989 | list |
| 4946 Askalaphus | 10.2 | 48.209 | 52.71 | 66.10 | L4 | 22.73 | 0.940 | 1988 | list |
| 22149 Cinyras | 10.2 | 48.190 | 50.77 | 50.37 | L4 | 7.84 | 1.090 | 2000 | list |
| 32496 Deïopites | 10.2 | 48.017 | 50.77 | 51.63 | L5 | 23.34 | 0.950 | 2000 | list |
| 5120 Bitias | 10.2 | 47.987 | 50.77 | n.a. | L5 | 15.21 | 0.780 | 1988 | list |
| 12714 Alkimos | 10.1 | 47.819 | 61.04 | 54.62 | L4 | 28.48 | – | 1991 | list |
| 7352 Hypsenor | 9.9 | 47.731 | 55.67 | 47.07 | L5 | 648 | 0.850 | 1994 | list |
| 1870 Glaukos | 10.6 | 47.649 | 42.23 | n.a. | L5 | 5.99 | — | 1971 | list |
| 4138 Kalchas | 10.1 | 46.462 | 53.16 | 61.04 | L4 | 29.2 | 0.810 | 1973 | list |
| 23958 Theronice | 10.2 | 46.001 | 50.77 | 47.91 | L4 | 562 | 0.990 | 1998 | list |
| 4828 Misenus | 10.4 | 45.954 | 46.30 | 43.22 | L5 | 12.87 | 0.920 | 1988 | list |
| 4057 Demophon | 10.1 | 45.683 | 53.16 | n.a. | L4 | 29.82 | 1.060 | 1985 | list |
| 4501 Eurypylos | 10.4 | 45.524 | 46.30 | n.a. | L4 | 6.05 | – | 1989 | list |
| 4007 Euryalos | 10.3 | 45.515 | 48.48 | 53.89 | L4 | 6.39 | – | 1973 | list |
| 5259 Epeigeus | 10.3 | 44.741 | 42.59 | 44.42 | L4 | 18.42 | – | 1989 | list |
| 30705 Idaios | 10.4 | 44.546 | 46.30 | n.a. | L5 | 15.74 | – | 1977 | list |
| 16560 Daitor | 10.7 | 43.861 | 51.42 | 43.38 | L5 | – | – | 1991 | list |
| 15977 Pyraechmes | 10.4 | 43.530 | 46.30 | 51.53 | L5 | 250 | 0.906 | 1998 | list |
| 7543 Prylis | 10.6 | 42.893 | 42.23 | n.a. | L4 | 17.80 | – | 1973 | list |
| 4827 Dares | 10.5 | 42.770 | 44.22 | n.a. | L5 | 19.00 | – | 1988 | list |
| 1647 Menelaus | 10.5 | 42.716 | 44.22 | n.a. | L4 | 17.74 | 0.866 | 1957 | list |
^{(A)} Used sources: WISE/NEOWISE catalog (NEOWISE_DIAM_V1 PDS, Grav, 2012); IRAS data (SIMPS v.6 catalog); and Akari catalog (Usui, 2011); RP: rotation period and V–I (color index) taken from the LCDB Note: missing data was completed with figures from the JPL SBDB (query) and from the LCDB (query form) for the WISE/NEOWISE and SIMPS catalogs, respectively. These figures are given in italics. Also, listing is incomplete above #100.

== Naming ==
This minor planet was named from Greek mythology after Orsilochus, son of Diocles (Diokles) and twin brother of Crethon (see 5285 Krethon). The Achaean warrior fought under Agamemnon and Menelaus in the Trojan War, where he was slain by Aeneas. The official naming citation was published by the Minor Planet Center on 12 July 1995 (M.P.C. 25444).
