= 4715 Medesicaste =

Trojan asteroid

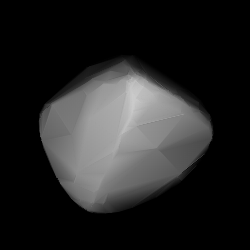
- Shape model of Medesicaste from its lightcurve

Discovery
- Discovered by: Y. Oshima
- Discovery site: Gekko Obs.
- Discovery date: 9 October 1989

Designations
- Named after: Medesicaste (Greek mythology)
- Alternative designations: 1989 TS_{1} · 1972 GL_{1} 1983 DF
- Minor planet category: Jupiter trojan Trojan · background
- Adjectives: Medesicastean

Orbital characteristics
- Epoch 23 March 2018 (JD 2458200.5)
- Uncertainty parameter 0
- Observation arc: 63.62 yr (23,236 d)
- Aphelion: 5.3591 AU
- Perihelion: 4.8598 AU
- Semi-major axis: 5.1094 AU
- Eccentricity: 0.0489
- Orbital period (sidereal): 11.55 yr (4,218 d)
- Mean anomaly: 180.77°
- Mean motion: 0° 5^{m} 7.08^{s} / day
- Inclination: 18.658°
- Longitude of ascending node: 1.6077°
- Argument of perihelion: 345.36°
- Jupiter MOID: 0.0924 AU
- T_{Jupiter}: 2.8940

Physical characteristics
- Mean diameter: 62.10±0.43 km 65.93±1.80 km
- Synodic rotation period: 8.8129±0.0025 h
- Geometric albedo: 0.060±0.010; 0.079±0.005
- Spectral type: C (assumed); B–V = 0.680±0.060; V–R = 0.430±0.040; V–I = 0.850±0.030
- Absolute magnitude (H): 9.30; 9.7

4715 Medesicaste (prov. designation: 1989 TS_{1}) is a dark Jupiter trojan from the Trojan camp, approximately 64 kilometers (40 miles) in diameter. It was discovered on 9 October 1989, by Japanese astronomer Yoshiaki Oshima at the Gekko Observatory east of Shizuoka, Japan. The assumed C-type asteroid belongs to the 70 largest Jupiter trojans. It is possibly elongated in shape and has a rotation period of 8.8 hours. It was named from Greek mythology after Medesicaste, an illegitimate daughter of Trojan King Priam.

== Orbit and classification ==
Medesicaste is orbiting in the trailering Trojan camp, at Jupiter's L_{5} Lagrangian point, 60° behind the Gas Giant's orbit in a 1:1 resonance. It is also a non-family asteroid of the Jovian background population. It orbits the Sun at a distance of 4.9–5.4 AU once every 11 years and 7 months (4,218 days; semi-major axis of 5.11 AU). Its orbit has an eccentricity of 0.05 and an inclination of 19° with respect to the ecliptic. The body's observation arc begins with a precovery taken at Palomar Observatory in October 1954, or 35 years prior to its official discovery observation at Gekko.

== Numbering and naming ==
This minor planet was numbered by the Minor Planet Center on 30 January 1991 (M.P.C. 17619). On 14 May 2021, the object was named by the Working Group for Small Bodies Nomenclature (WGSBN), after Medesicaste from Greek mythology, who was an illegitimate daughter of King Priam and wife of Imbrius.

Before Medesicaste was named, it belonged to a small group of only 8 unnamed minor planets with a designated number smaller than 5000. (All of them are Jupiter trojans or near-Earth asteroids). Since then, several have already been named :

- 3708 Socus (3708) 1974 FV_{1} – named in May 2021
- 4035 Thestor (4035) 1986 WD – named in May 2021
- 4489 Dracius (4489) 1988 AK – named in May 2021
- (4596) 1981 QB
- (4688) 1980 WF
- 4715 Medesicaste (4715) 1989 TS_{1} – named in May 2021
- 4835 Asaeus (4835) 1989 BQ
- (4953) 1990 MU

== Physical characteristics ==
Medesicaste is an assumed C-type asteroid. It has a V–I color index of 0.85, slightly below that seen for most Jovian D-type asteroids (also seen table below).

=== Rotation period ===
A rotational lightcurve of Medesicaste was first obtained by Stefano Mottola in November 1991, using the Loiano 1.52-meter telescope at Bologna Observatory in Italy. Lightcurve analysis gave a rotation period of 8.8129±0.0025 hours with a brightness amplitude of 0.46 magnitude (U=3). In September 2012, it was also observed in the R-band by astronomers at the Palomar Transient Factory in California (U=2).

Since January 2015, several photometric observations by Robert Stephens at the Center for Solar System Studies in California confirmed Mottola's period determination from 1991, and measured a brightness amplitude of 0.50–0.53, which is indicative of a non-spherical, possibly elongated shape (U=3-/3-/3). (Note: Lightcurve plots of (4715) 1989 TS1 from Jan 2015, Dec 2015, Feb 2017 and 2018 by Robert Stephens at the Center for Solar System Studies (U81). Quality code is 3/3/3/3 (lightcurve rating at CS3). Summary figures at the LCDB and CS3.)

=== Diameter and albedo ===
According to the surveys carried out by the Japanese Akari satellite and the NEOWISE mission of NASA's Wide-field Infrared Survey Explorer, Medesicaste measures between 62.10 and 65.93 kilometers in diameter and its surface has an albedo between 0.060 and 0.079. It has not been observed by the Supplemental IRAS Minor Planet Survey. The Collaborative Asteroid Lightcurve Link assumes a standard albedo for a carbonaceous asteroid of 0.057 and calculates a diameter of 63.91 kilometers based on an absolute magnitude of 9.7.

100+ largest Jupiter trojans

Largest Jupiter Trojans by survey^{(A)} (mean-diameter in kilometers; RP: rotation period in hours; YoD: Year of Discovery)
| Designation | H | WISE | IRAS | Akari | Ln | RP | V–I | YoD | Ref |
|---|---|---|---|---|---|---|---|---|---|
| 624 Hektor | 7.2 | 225 | 233 | 230.99 | L4 | 6.92 | 0.930 | 1907 | list |
| 617 Patroclus | 8.19 | 140.362 | 140.92 | 140.85 | L5 | 102.80 | 0.830 | 1906 | list |
| 911 Agamemnon | 7.89 | 131.038 | 166.66 | 185.30 | L4 | 6.59 | 0.980 | 1919 | list |
| 588 Achilles | 8.67 | 130.099 | 135.47 | 133.22 | L4 | 7.31 | 0.940 | 1906 | list |
| 3451 Mentor | 8.4 | 126.288 | 116.30 | 117.91 | L5 | 7.70 | 0.770 | 1984 | list |
| 3317 Paris | 8.3 | 118.790 | 116.26 | 120.45 | L5 | 7.09 | 0.950 | 1984 | list |
| 1867 Deiphobus | 8.3 | 118.220 | 122.67 | 131.31 | L5 | 58.66 | 0.930 | 1971 | list |
| 1172 Äneas | 8.33 | 118.020 | 142.82 | 148.66 | L5 | 8.71 | 0.950 | 1930 | list |
| 1437 Diomedes | 8.3 | 117.786 | 164.31 | 172.60 | L4 | 24.49 | 0.810 | 1937 | list |
| 1143 Odysseus | 7.93 | 114.624 | 125.64 | 130.81 | L4 | 10.11 | 0.860 | 1930 | list |
| 2241 Alcathous | 8.64 | 113.682 | 114.63 | 118.87 | L5 | 7.69 | 0.940 | 1979 | list |
| 659 Nestor | 8.99 | 112.320 | 108.87 | 107.06 | L4 | 15.98 | 0.790 | 1908 | list |
| 3793 Leonteus | 8.7 | 112.046 | 86.26 | 87.58 | L4 | 5.62 | 0.780 | 1985 | list |
| 3063 Makhaon | 8.4 | 111.655 | 116.14 | 114.34 | L4 | 8.64 | 0.830 | 1983 | list |
| 1583 Antilochus | 8.6 | 108.842 | 101.62 | 111.69 | L4 | 31.54 | 0.950 | 1950 | list |
| 884 Priamus | 8.81 | 101.093 | 96.29 | 119.99 | L5 | 6.86 | 0.900 | 1917 | list |
| 1208 Troilus | 8.99 | 100.477 | 103.34 | 111.36 | L5 | 56.17 | 0.740 | 1931 | list |
| 1173 Anchises | 8.89 | 99.549 | 126.27 | 120.49 | L5 | 11.60 | 0.780 | 1930 | list |
| 2207 Antenor | 8.89 | 97.658 | 85.11 | 91.32 | L5 | 7.97 | 0.950 | 1977 | list |
| 2363 Cebriones | 9.11 | 95.976 | 81.84 | 84.61 | L5 | 20.05 | 0.910 | 1977 | list |
| 4063 Euforbo | 8.7 | 95.619 | 102.46 | 106.38 | L4 | 8.85 | 0.950 | 1989 | list |
| 2357 Phereclos | 8.94 | 94.625 | 94.90 | 98.45 | L5 | 14.39 | 0.960 | 1981 | list |
| 4709 Ennomos | 8.5 | 91.433 | 80.85 | 80.03 | L5 | 12.28 | 0.690 | 1988 | list |
| 2797 Teucer | 8.7 | 89.430 | 111.14 | 113.99 | L4 | 10.15 | 0.920 | 1981 | list |
| 2920 Automedon | 8.8 | 88.574 | 111.01 | 113.11 | L4 | 10.21 | 0.950 | 1981 | list |
| 15436 Dexius | 9.1 | 87.646 | 85.71 | 78.63 | L4 | 8.97 | 0.870 | 1998 | list |
| 3596 Meriones | 9.2 | 87.380 | 75.09 | 73.28 | L4 | 12.96 | 0.830 | 1985 | list |
| 2893 Peiroos | 9.23 | 86.884 | 87.46 | 86.76 | L5 | 8.96 | 0.950 | 1975 | list |
| 4086 Podalirius | 9.1 | 85.495 | 86.89 | 85.98 | L4 | 10.43 | 0.870 | 1985 | list |
| 4060 Deipylos | 9.3 | 84.043 | 79.21 | 86.79 | L4 | 9.30 | 0.760 | 1987 | list |
| 1404 Ajax | 9.3 | 83.990 | 81.69 | 96.34 | L4 | 29.38 | 0.960 | 1936 | list |
| 4348 Poulydamas | 9.5 | 82.032 | 70.08 | 87.51 | L5 | 9.91 | 0.840 | 1988 | list |
| 5144 Achates | 9.0 | 80.958 | 91.91 | 89.85 | L5 | 5.96 | 0.920 | 1991 | list |
| 4833 Meges | 8.9 | 80.165 | 87.33 | 89.39 | L4 | 14.25 | 0.940 | 1989 | list |
| 2223 Sarpedon | 9.41 | 77.480 | 94.63 | 108.21 | L5 | 22.74 | 0.880 | 1977 | list |
| 4489 Dracius | 9.0 | 76.595 | 92.93 | 95.02 | L4 | 12.58 | 0.950 | 1988 | list |
| 2260 Neoptolemus | 9.31 | 76.435 | 71.65 | 81.28 | L4 | 8.18 | 0.950 | 1975 | list |
| 5254 Ulysses | 9.2 | 76.147 | 78.34 | 80.00 | L4 | 28.72 | 0.970 | 1986 | list |
| 3708 Socus | 9.3 | 75.661 | 79.59 | 76.75 | L5 | 6.55 | 0.980 | 1974 | list |
| 2674 Pandarus | 9.1 | 74.267 | 98.10 | 101.72 | L5 | 8.48 | 1.000 | 1982 | list |
| 3564 Talthybius | 9.4 | 73.730 | 68.92 | 74.11 | L4 | 40.59 | 0.900 | 1985 | list |
| 4834 Thoas | 9.1 | 72.331 | 86.82 | 96.21 | L4 | 18.19 | 0.950 | 1989 | list |
| 7641 Cteatus | 9.4 | 71.839 | 68.97 | 75.28 | L4 | 27.77 | 0.980 | 1986 | list |
| 3540 Protesilaos | 9.3 | 70.225 | 76.84 | 87.66 | L4 | 8.95 | 0.940 | 1973 | list |
| 11395 Iphinous | 9.8 | 68.977 | 64.71 | 67.78 | L4 | 17.38 | – | 1998 | list |
| 4035 Thestor | 9.6 | 68.733 | 68.23 | 66.99 | L4 | 13.47 | 0.970 | 1986 | list |
| 5264 Telephus | 9.4 | 68.472 | 73.26 | 81.38 | L4 | 9.53 | 0.970 | 1991 | list |
| 1868 Thersites | 9.5 | 68.163 | 70.08 | 78.89 | L4 | 10.48 | 0.960 | 1960 | list |
| 9799 Thronium | 9.6 | 68.033 | 64.87 | 72.42 | L4 | 21.52 | 0.910 | 1996 | list |
| 4068 Menestheus | 9.5 | 67.625 | 62.37 | 68.46 | L4 | 14.40 | 0.950 | 1973 | list |
| 23135 Pheidas | 9.9 | 66.230 | 58.29 | 68.50 | L4 | 8.69 | 0.860 | 2000 | list |
| 2456 Palamedes | 9.3 | 65.916 | 91.66 | 99.60 | L4 | 7.24 | 0.920 | 1966 | list |
| 3709 Polypoites | 9.1 | 65.297 | 99.09 | 85.23 | L4 | 10.04 | 1.000 | 1985 | list |
| 1749 Telamon | 9.5 | 64.898 | 81.06 | 69.14 | L4 | 16.98 | 0.970 | 1949 | list |
| 3548 Eurybates | 9.6 | 63.885 | 72.14 | 68.40 | L4 | 8.71 | 0.730 | 1973 | list |
| 4543 Phoinix | 9.7 | 63.836 | 62.79 | 69.54 | L4 | 38.87 | 1.200 | 1989 | list |
| 12444 Prothoon | 9.8 | 63.835 | 64.31 | 62.41 | L5 | 15.82 | – | 1996 | list |
| 4836 Medon | 9.5 | 63.277 | 67.73 | 78.70 | L4 | 9.82 | 0.920 | 1989 | list |
| 16070 Charops | 9.7 | 63.191 | 64.13 | 68.98 | L5 | 20.24 | 0.960 | 1999 | list |
| 15440 Eioneus | 9.6 | 62.519 | 66.48 | 71.88 | L4 | 21.43 | 0.970 | 1998 | list |
| 4715 Medesicaste | 9.7 | 62.097 | 63.91 | 65.93 | L5 | 8.81 | 0.850 | 1989 | list |
| 34746 Thoon | 9.8 | 61.684 | 60.51 | 63.63 | L5 | 19.63 | 0.950 | 2001 | list |
| 38050 Bias | 9.8 | 61.603 | 61.04 | 50.44 | L4 | 18.85 | 0.990 | 1998 | list |
| 5130 Ilioneus | 9.7 | 60.711 | 59.40 | 52.49 | L5 | 14.77 | 0.960 | 1989 | list |
| 5027 Androgeos | 9.6 | 59.786 | 57.86 | n.a. | L4 | 11.38 | 0.910 | 1988 | list |
| 6090 Aulis | 9.4 | 59.568 | 74.53 | 81.92 | L4 | 18.48 | 0.980 | 1989 | list |
| 5648 Axius | 9.7 | 59.295 | 63.91 | n.a. | L5 | 37.56 | 0.900 | 1990 | list |
| 7119 Hiera | 9.7 | 59.150 | 76.40 | 77.29 | L4 | 400 | 0.950 | 1989 | list |
| 4805 Asteropaios | 10.0 | 57.647 | 53.16 | 43.44 | L5 | 12.37 | – | 1990 | list |
| 16974 Iphthime | 9.8 | 57.341 | 55.43 | 57.15 | L4 | 78.9 | 0.960 | 1998 | list |
| 4867 Polites | 9.8 | 57.251 | 58.29 | 64.29 | L5 | 11.24 | 1.010 | 1989 | list |
| 2895 Memnon | 10.0 | 56.706 | 55.67 | n.a. | L5 | 7.50 | 0.710 | 1981 | list |
| 4708 Polydoros | 9.9 | 54.964 | 55.67 | n.a. | L5 | 7.52 | 0.960 | 1988 | list |
| 21601 Aias | 10.0 | 54.909 | 55.67 | 56.08 | L4 | 12.65 | 0.970 | 1998 | list |
| 12929 Periboea | 9.9 | 54.077 | 61.04 | 55.34 | L5 | 9.27 | 0.880 | 1999 | list |
| 17492 Hippasos | 10.0 | 53.975 | 55.67 | n.a. | L5 | 17.75 | – | 1991 | list |
| 5652 Amphimachus | 10.1 | 53.921 | 53.16 | 52.48 | L4 | 8.37 | 1.050 | 1992 | list |
| 2759 Idomeneus | 9.9 | 53.676 | 61.01 | 52.55 | L4 | 32.38 | 0.910 | 1980 | list |
| 5258 Rhoeo | 10.2 | 53.275 | 50.77 | n.a. | L4 | 19.85 | 1.010 | 1989 | list |
| 12126 Chersidamas | 10.1 | 53.202 | n.a. | n.a. | L5 | n.a. | ? | 1999 | list |
| 15502 Hypeirochus | 10.0 | 53.100 | 55.67 | 50.86 | L5 | 15.13 | 0.875 | 1999 | list |
| 4754 Panthoos | 10.0 | 53.025 | 53.15 | 56.96 | L5 | 27.68 | – | 1977 | list |
| 4832 Palinurus | 10.0 | 52.058 | 53.16 | n.a. | L5 | 5.32 | 1.000 | 1988 | list |
| 5126 Achaemenides | 10.5 | 51.922 | 44.22 | 48.57 | L4 | 53.02 | – | 1989 | list |
| 3240 Laocoon | 10.2 | 51.695 | 50.77 | n.a. | L5 | 11.31 | 0.880 | 1978 | list |
| 4902 Thessandrus | 9.8 | 51.263 | 61.04 | 71.79 | L4 | 738 | 0.960 | 1989 | list |
| 11552 Boucolion | 10.1 | 51.136 | 53.16 | 53.91 | L5 | 32.44 | – | 1993 | list |
| 20729 Opheltius | 10.4 | 50.961 | 46.30 | n.a. | L4 | 5.72 | 1.000 | 1999 | list |
| 6545 Leitus | 10.1 | 50.951 | 53.16 | n.a. | L4 | 16.26 | 0.910 | 1986 | list |
| 4792 Lykaon | 10.1 | 50.870 | 53.16 | n.a. | L5 | 40.09 | 0.960 | 1988 | list |
| 21900 Orus | 10.0 | 50.810 | 55.67 | 53.87 | L4 | 13.45 | 0.950 | 1999 | list |
| 1873 Agenor | 10.1 | 50.799 | 53.76 | 54.38 | L5 | 20.60 | – | 1971 | list |
| 5028 Halaesus | 10.2 | 50.770 | 50.77 | n.a. | L4 | 24.94 | 0.900 | 1988 | list |
| 2146 Stentor | 9.9 | 50.755 | 58.29 | n.a. | L4 | 16.40 | – | 1976 | list |
| 4722 Agelaos | 10.0 | 50.378 | 53.16 | 59.47 | L5 | 18.44 | 0.910 | 1977 | list |
| 5284 Orsilocus | 10.1 | 50.159 | 53.16 | n.a. | L4 | 10.31 | 0.970 | 1989 | list |
| 11509 Thersilochos | 10.1 | 49.960 | 53.16 | 56.23 | L5 | 17.37 | – | 1990 | list |
| 5285 Krethon | 10.1 | 49.606 | 58.53 | 52.61 | L4 | 12.04 | 1.090 | 1989 | list |
| 4791 Iphidamas | 10.1 | 49.528 | 57.85 | 59.96 | L5 | 9.70 | 1.030 | 1988 | list |
| 9023 Mnesthus | 10.1 | 49.151 | 50.77 | 60.80 | L5 | 30.66 | – | 1988 | list |
| 5283 Pyrrhus | 9.7 | 48.356 | 64.58 | 69.93 | L4 | 7.32 | 0.950 | 1989 | list |
| 4946 Askalaphus | 10.2 | 48.209 | 52.71 | 66.10 | L4 | 22.73 | 0.940 | 1988 | list |
| 22149 Cinyras | 10.2 | 48.190 | 50.77 | 50.37 | L4 | 7.84 | 1.090 | 2000 | list |
| 32496 Deïopites | 10.2 | 48.017 | 50.77 | 51.63 | L5 | 23.34 | 0.950 | 2000 | list |
| 5120 Bitias | 10.2 | 47.987 | 50.77 | n.a. | L5 | 15.21 | 0.780 | 1988 | list |
| 12714 Alkimos | 10.1 | 47.819 | 61.04 | 54.62 | L4 | 28.48 | – | 1991 | list |
| 7352 Hypsenor | 9.9 | 47.731 | 55.67 | 47.07 | L5 | 648 | 0.850 | 1994 | list |
| 1870 Glaukos | 10.6 | 47.649 | 42.23 | n.a. | L5 | 5.99 | — | 1971 | list |
| 4138 Kalchas | 10.1 | 46.462 | 53.16 | 61.04 | L4 | 29.2 | 0.810 | 1973 | list |
| 23958 Theronice | 10.2 | 46.001 | 50.77 | 47.91 | L4 | 562 | 0.990 | 1998 | list |
| 4828 Misenus | 10.4 | 45.954 | 46.30 | 43.22 | L5 | 12.87 | 0.920 | 1988 | list |
| 4057 Demophon | 10.1 | 45.683 | 53.16 | n.a. | L4 | 29.82 | 1.060 | 1985 | list |
| 4501 Eurypylos | 10.4 | 45.524 | 46.30 | n.a. | L4 | 6.05 | – | 1989 | list |
| 4007 Euryalos | 10.3 | 45.515 | 48.48 | 53.89 | L4 | 6.39 | – | 1973 | list |
| 5259 Epeigeus | 10.3 | 44.741 | 42.59 | 44.42 | L4 | 18.42 | – | 1989 | list |
| 30705 Idaios | 10.4 | 44.546 | 46.30 | n.a. | L5 | 15.74 | – | 1977 | list |
| 16560 Daitor | 10.7 | 43.861 | 51.42 | 43.38 | L5 | – | – | 1991 | list |
| 15977 Pyraechmes | 10.4 | 43.530 | 46.30 | 51.53 | L5 | 250 | 0.906 | 1998 | list |
| 7543 Prylis | 10.6 | 42.893 | 42.23 | n.a. | L4 | 17.80 | – | 1973 | list |
| 4827 Dares | 10.5 | 42.770 | 44.22 | n.a. | L5 | 19.00 | – | 1988 | list |
| 1647 Menelaus | 10.5 | 42.716 | 44.22 | n.a. | L4 | 17.74 | 0.866 | 1957 | list |
^{(A)} Used sources: WISE/NEOWISE catalog (NEOWISE_DIAM_V1 PDS, Grav, 2012); IRAS data (SIMPS v.6 catalog); and Akari catalog (Usui, 2011); RP: rotation period and V–I (color index) taken from the LCDB Note: missing data was completed with figures from the JPL SBDB (query) and from the LCDB (query form) for the WISE/NEOWISE and SIMPS catalogs, respectively. These figures are given in italics. Also, listing is incomplete above #100.
