= Machaon (mythology) =

Mythical Greek healer hero

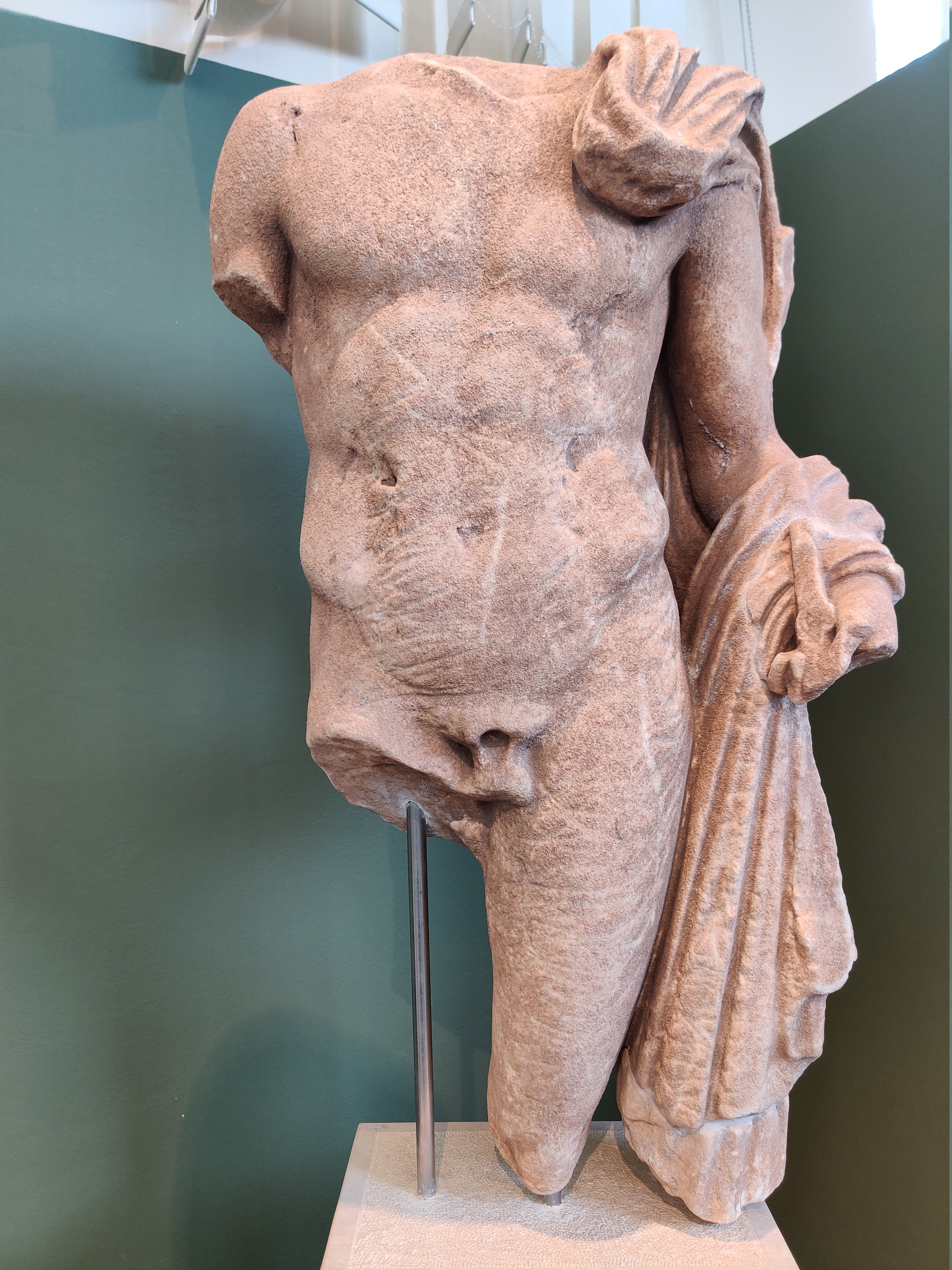
Marble torso probably representing the son of Asclepius, Machaon. 2nd century B.C. Ancient Messene museum.

In Greek mythology, Machaon (/məˈkeɪ.ən/; Ancient Greek: Μαχάων, romanized: Macháōn) was a son of Asclepius; and the older brother of Podalirius. He and his brother led an army from Tricca in the Trojan War on the side of the Greeks.

== Family ==
Machaon fathered Nicomachus and Gorgasus by Anticleia, daughter of Diocles of Pharae. His other sons were Alexanor, Sphyrus and Polemocrates.

According to Diogenes Laertius's Lives and Opinions of Eminent Philosophers, Hermippus, in his book On Aristotle, places Machaon as the son of Asclepius, father of Nicomachus, and ancestor of Aristotle.

== Mythology ==
Both Machaon and Podalirius were highly valued surgeons and medics. In the Iliad, he was wounded and put out of action by Paris. Machaon (or his brother) healed Telephus, Menelaus (after he sustained an arrow at the hand of Pandarus), and the foot infection of Philoctetes during the war. He was also supposed to possess herbs which were bestowed to his father Asclepius by Chiron, the centaur.

He was killed by Eurypylus in the tenth year of the war. He was buried in Gerenia in Messenia, where he was worshiped by the people.

In the account of Dares the Phrygian, Machaon was illustrated as ". . . large and brave, dependable, prudent, patient, and merciful."

== Legacy ==
- The Old World swallowtail butterfly (Papilio machaon) references Machaon in its binomial name.
- Machaonia, a plant genus in Rubiaceae, is named for Machaon.
- The Jovian trojan asteroid 3063 Makhaon is named after him.
