= Nicomachus (mythology) =

Set of mythological Greek characters

In Greek mythology, Nicomachus (Ancient Greek: Νικόμαχος, romanized: Nikomachos or Nikómakhos, lit. 'victor in the battle') may refer to two different figures:

- Nicomachus, son of Anticlia, daughter of King Diocles of Pherae, and Machaon, son of Asclepius. Nicomachus and his brother Gorgasus had a sanctuary at Pherae, founded by Glaucus, the son of Aepytus.
- Nicomachus, one of the Suitors of Penelope who came from Dulichium along with other 56 wooers. He, with the other suitors, was killed by Odysseus with the help of Eumaeus, Philoetius, and Telemachus.
