= Pharae (Crete) =

Ancient city in Crete

Pharae (Ancient Greek: Φαραί) was an ancient city in Crete, Greece. The city was founded by the city of Pharae in Messenia and named for it.
