= Dorodoche =

In Greek mythology, Dorodoche (Ancient Greek: Δωροδόχην) was a native of Pharae in Messenia as the daughter of Ortilochus. She was the wife of Icarius and the supposed mother of his progeny including Penelope, wife of Odysseus. Otherwise, Icarius’ spouse was variously named as Polycaste, Asterodia and the naiad Periboea.
