= Diocles (mythology) =

People in Greek mythology of the same name

In Greek mythology, Diocles (Ancient Greek: Διοκλῆς, romanized: Dioklēs, lit. 'glory of Zeus' or 'divine glory') may refer to:

- Diocles or Dioclus, king and one of the first priests of Demeter, and one of the first to learn the secrets of the Eleusinian Mysteries, along with Triptolemus and Polyxenus.
- Diocles, king of Megara, who was overthrown by Theseus, as a result of which Eleusis was annexed from Megara. He may be identical to the previous Diocles on this list.
- Diocles, king of Pherae as son of previous ruler Orsilochus. He was possibly the brother of Medusa, wife of Polybus of Corinth and Dorodoche, wife of Icarius of Sparta. Diocles was the father of the twins Orsilochus and Crethon, and also of Anticleia, the mother of Nicomachus and Gorgasus by Machaon. These two grandsons succeeded him on the throne after his death. In the Odyssey, Telemachus and Peisistratus spent a night at his house on their way to Sparta, as well as on their way back.
