= Aepytus (son of Cresphontes) =

In Greek mythology, Aepytus (Ancient Greek: Αἴπυτος, romanized: Aíputos or Aípytos, lit. 'steep', 'high' or 'lofty') was the youngest son of Cresphontes the Heraclid, king of Messenia, and of Merope, the daughter of the Arcadian king Cypselus.

== Mythology ==
Cresphontes and his other sons were murdered during an insurrection, and Aepytus alone, who was educated in the house of his grandfather Cypselus, escaped the danger. The throne of Cresphontes was in the meantime occupied by the Heraclid Polyphontes, who also forced Merope to become his wife. When Aepytus had grown to manhood, he was enabled by the aid of Holaeas, his uncle, to return to his kingdom of Messenia, punish the murderers of his father, and put Polyphontes to death. He left a son, Glaucus, and it was from him that subsequently the kings of Messenia were called Aepytids instead of the more general name Heraclids.
