= Anticlea (mythology) =

Women in Greek mythology

In Greek mythology, Anticlea, Anticlia or Anticleia (/ˌæntɪˈkliːə/; Ancient Greek: Ἀντίκλεια, romanized: Antíkleia, lit. 'without fame') may refer to the following women:

- Anticlea, another name for Philonoe, the Lycian bride of Bellerophon and mother of his children. In other accounts, she was called Alcimedusa or Cassandra or Pasandra.
- Anticlea, mother by Hephaestus of Periphetes, the lame malefactor of Epidaurus who was killed by the hero Theseus in one of his exploits.
- Anticlea, daughter of Autolycus and mother of Odysseus by Läertes.
- Anticlea, daughter of Diocles, king of Pherae, according to Pausanias. She married Asclepius' son Machaon and had by him two sons, Nicomachus and Gorgasus.
