= Pharae (Messenia) =

Ancient town of Messenia

Pharae (Ancient Greek: Φαραί, Strab., Paus.; Φηρή, Hom. Il. 5.543; Φηραί, Il. 9.151; Φεραί, Xen. Hell. 4.8.7) was an ancient town of Messenia, situated upon a hill rising from the left bank of the river Nedon, and at a distance of a mile (1.5 km) from the Messenian Gulf. Strabo describes it as situated 5 stadia from the sea, and Pausanias 6. William Smith states that it is probable that the earth deposited at the mouth of the river Nedon has, in the course of centuries, encroached upon the sea. Pausanias distinguishes this city from the Achaean city of Pharae (Φαραὶ), 150 stadia from Patrae and 70 stadia from the coast. Pherae occupied the site of Kalamata, the modern capital of Messenia; and in antiquity also it seems to have been the chief town in the southern Messenian plain.

It was said to have been founded by Pharis, the son of Hermes and the Danaid Phylodameia.

In Homer, Pherae was the home of Diocles, whose sons Crethon and Orsilochus were killed by Aeneas. As part of his entreaty to Achilles Agamemnon promised to include "holy Pherae" as one of seven "strongholds" in the dowry of the daughter Achilles chooses to marry if he returned to the fight on behalf of the Achaeans. Strabo argues that Pherae must have belonged to the Atreides; otherwise Agamemnon would not have offered it. The home of Diocles is also where Telemachus and Peisistratus spent a night at his house on their way from Pylos to visit king Menelaus in Lacedaemon and their return.

Xenophon records that Pherae (Φεραί) was one of the Lacedaemonian cities razed by Persian satrap Pharnabazus II and Athenian General Conon during the Corinthian War (in 394 BCE).

After the capture of Messene by the Achaeans in 182 BCE, Pharae, Abia, and Thuria separated themselves from Messene, and became each a distinct member of the league. Pausanias says that because Messenia sided with Antony during the Roman civil war, Augustus punitively had Pherae and all of Messenia incorporated into Laconia, but it was restored to Messenia by Tiberius. Pausanias visited it and noted temples of Tyche, and of Nicomachus and Gorgasus, grandsons of Asclepius. Outside the city there was a grove of Apollo Carneius, and in it a fountain of water. Strabo correctly describes Pharae as having an anchorage, but only for summer. The city established a colony of the same name in Crete.

There are no ancient remains at Kalamata, which is not surprising, as the place has always been well occupied and inhabited. The height above the town is crowned by a ruined medieval castle. It was the residence of several of the Latin rulers of the Morea. William of Villehardouin was born here. In 1685 it was conquered and enlarged by the Venetians. It was the headquarters of the insurrection of 1770, and again of the Greek Revolution of 1821, which spread from thence over the whole peninsula.
