= Ocyrhoe =

Set of mythological Greek characters

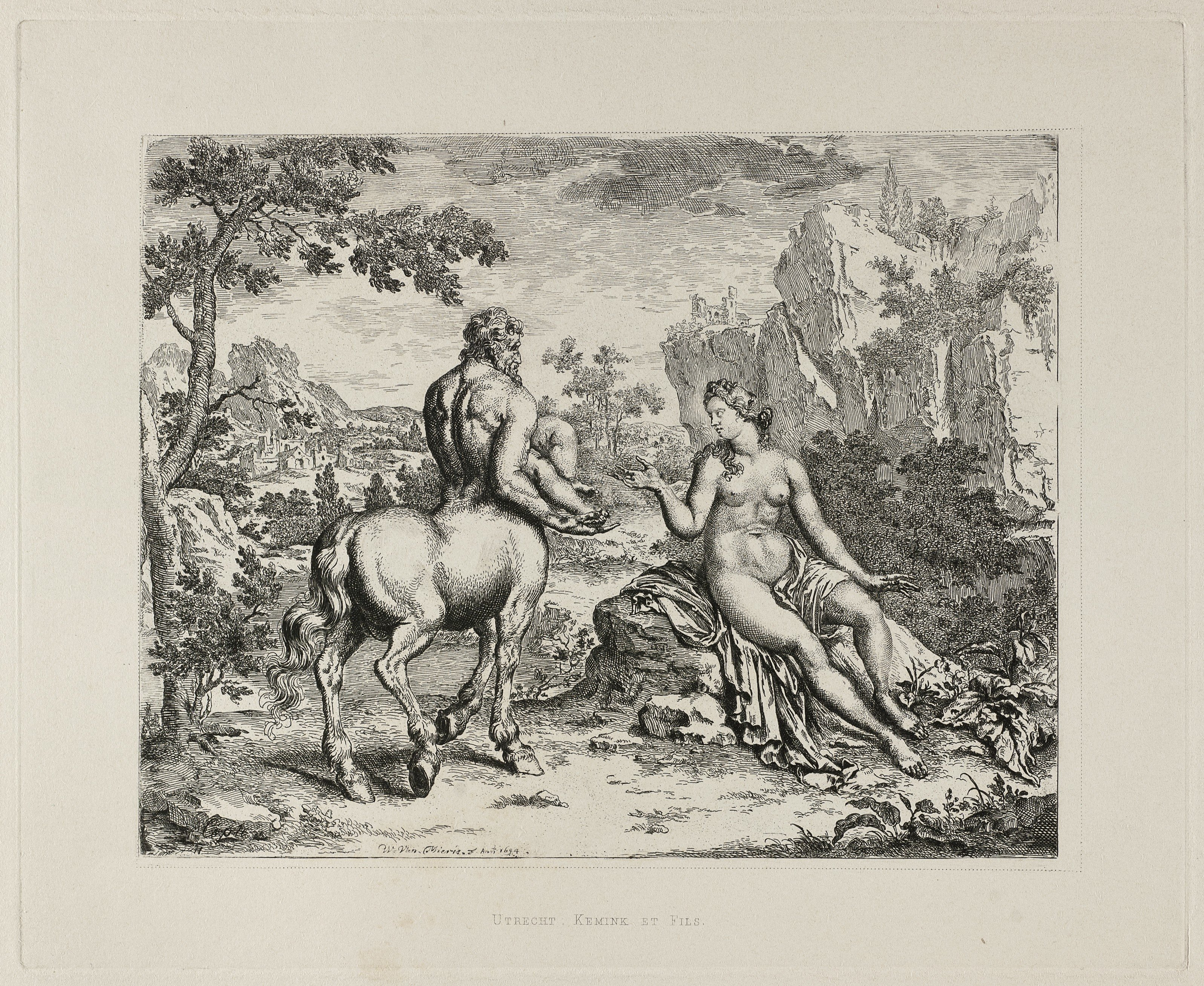
Ocyrhoë verteld haar vader Cheiron het lot van Aesculapius (Ocyrhoe tells her father Cheiron the fate of Aesculapius). 19th-century etching of a print by Willem van Mieris, 1694

Ocyrhoe (/oʊˈsɪroʊiː/; Ancient Greek: Ὠκυρόη) or Ocyrrhoe (Ὠκυρρόη) refers to at least five characters in Greek mythology.

- Ocyrrhoe, one of the 3,000 Oceanids, water-nymph daughters of the Titans Oceanus and his sister-spouse Tethys. She was the mother of Phasis by Helios. Ocyrhoe may refer to 'speed and mobility'.
- Ocyrhoe, daughter of Chiron and Chariclo. She was transformed into a horse because she told her father Chiron his exact fate. Ocyrhoe revealed that he would forsake his immortality to be spared the agonizing pain of a serpent's poison. For this transgression, Ocyrhoe's ability to speak was taken. One might assume that she turned into a horse because her father was a centaur, and because she had long, auburn hair.
- Ocyrrhoe or Ocyone, a naiad-nymph. She was the mother, by Hippasus, of Hippomedon (a defender of Troy), to whom she gave birth on the banks of River Sangarius. Her son was killed by Neoptolemus.
- Ocyrhoë, the nymph daughter of the river god Imbrasus and Chesias, a noble maiden. While in Miletus at a festival in honor of Artemis, she caught Apollo's attention and, fleeing from his advances, asked Pompilus, a seafarer and an old friend of her father, to take her home. Pompilus took her on board the ship, but Apollo caught up with them, took the girl and then changed the ship into stone and Pompilus into a fish.
- Ocyrrhoe, a nymph of Mysia, mother of Caicus by Hermes.
