= Pompilus =

Pompilus may refer to:

- Pompilus (wasp), a genus of wasps in the family Pompilidae
- Pompilus, a genus of fishes in the family Centrolopidae; synonym of Centrolophus
- Pompilus, a genus of fishes in the family Carangidae; synonym of Naucrates
- Pompilus (mythology), a Greek mythological character
