= Achaemenes (disambiguation) =

Achaemenes was the supposed founder of the Achaemenid dynasty, the rulers of the Achaemenid Empire, the first Persian empire.

Achaemenes may also refer to:

- Achaemenes (satrap), the satrap of Egypt from 484 BC until his death in 460 BC

== See also ==
- Achaemenides, a minor fictional character in Virgil's Aeneid
