= Imbrasus =

Name in Greek mythology

In Greek mythology, Imbrasus (Ancient Greek: Ιμβρασος or Ἴμβρασος Imbrasos) may refer to the following personages:

- Imbrasus, a river-god of the island of Samos. As one of the river gods, he was presumably the son of the Titans Oceanus and Tethys. Imbrasus' wife was the fairest of the nymphs, Chesias. Their daughter, Ocyrrhoe, was loved by Apollo.
- Imbrasus, the Thracian father of Asius and Peirous, one of the Trojan leaders during the Trojan War.
