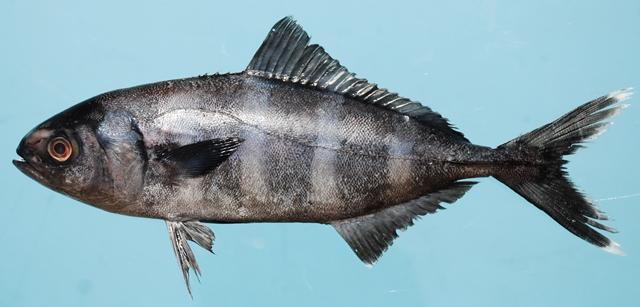
- Near Mangalore, India

Conservation status
- Least Concern (IUCN 3.1)

Scientific classification
- Kingdom: Animalia
- Phylum: Chordata
- Class: Actinopterygii
- Division: Teleostei
- Order: Carangiformes
- Suborder: Carangoidei
- Family: Carangidae
- Subfamily: Naucratinae
- Genus: Naucrates; Rafinesque, 1810
- Species: N. ductor

Binomial name
- Naucrates ductor (Linnaeus, 1758)

Synonyms
- List: Gasterosteus ductor Linnaeus, 1758; Hemitripteronotus quinquemaculatus Lacépède, 1801; Naucrates fanfarus Rafinesque, 1810; Naucrates indicus Lesson, 1831; Naucrates noveboracensis Cuvier, 1832; Nauclerus compressus Valenciennes, 1833; Seriola dussumieri Valenciennes, 1833; Seriola succincta Valenciennes, 1833; Nauclerus abreviatus Valenciennes, 1833; Nauclerus brachycentrus Valenciennes, 1833; Nauclerus triacanthus Valenciennes, 1833; Nauclerus annularis Valenciennes, 1833; Nauclerus leucurus Valenciennes, 1833; Naucrates cyanophrys Swainson, 1839; Naucrates serratus Swainson, 1839; Thynnus pompilus Gronow, 1854; Naucrates polysarcus Fowler, 1905; Naucrates angeli Whitley, 1931

= Pilot fish =

Species of fish

The pilot fish (Naucrates ductor) is a carnivorous fish of the trevally, or jackfish family, Carangidae. It is widely distributed and lives in warm or tropical open seas.

== Description ==
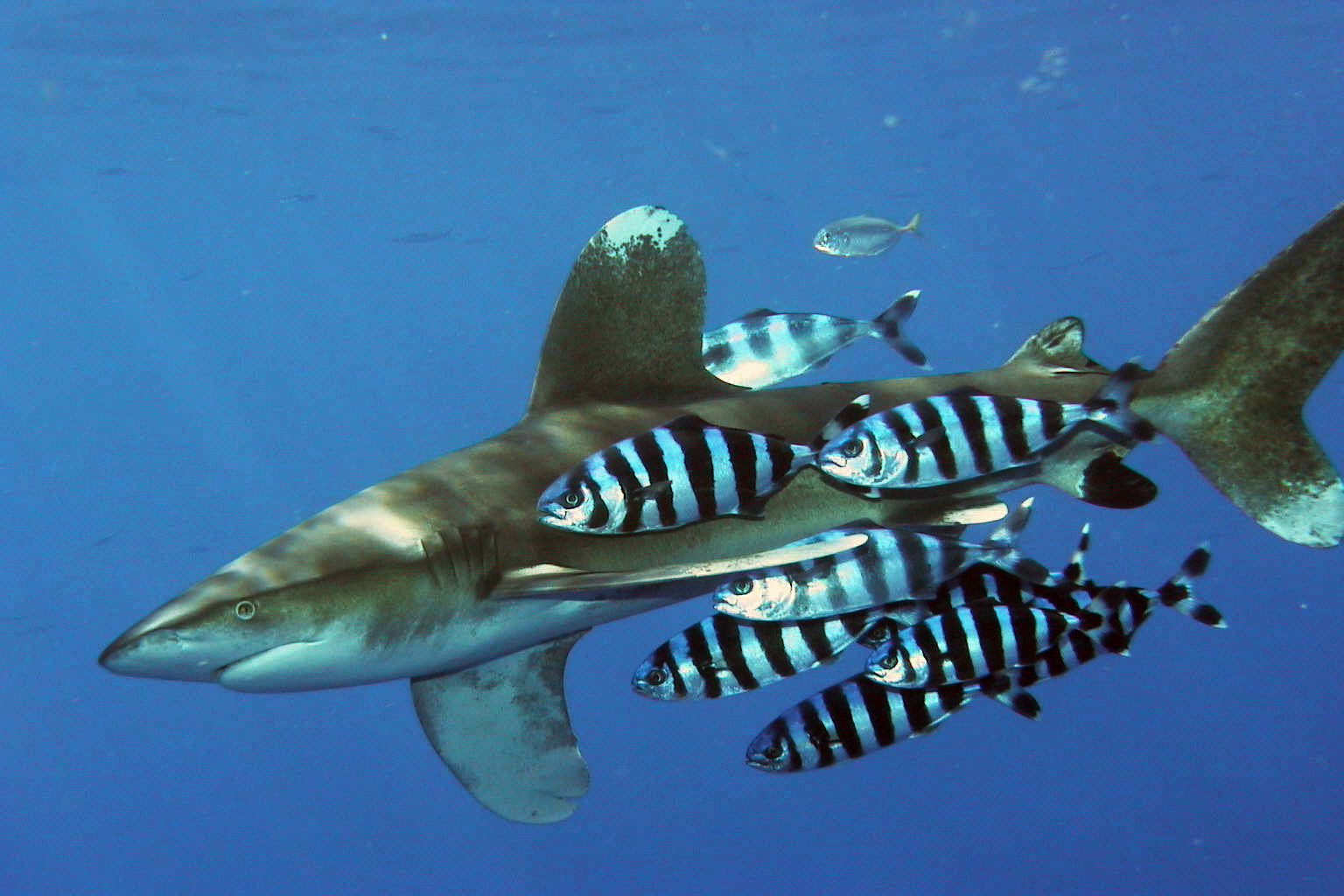
Pilot fish swimming with an oceanic whitetip shark

The pilot fish congregates around sharks, rays, and sea turtles, where it eats ectoparasites on, and leftovers around, the host species; younger pilot fish are usually associated with jellyfish and drifting seaweeds. They are also known to follow ships, sometimes for long distances; one was found in County Cork, Ireland, and many pilot fish have been sighted on the shores of England. Their fondness for ships led early seafarers (Greeks, Romans and their direct descendants) to believe that they would navigate a ship to its desired course.

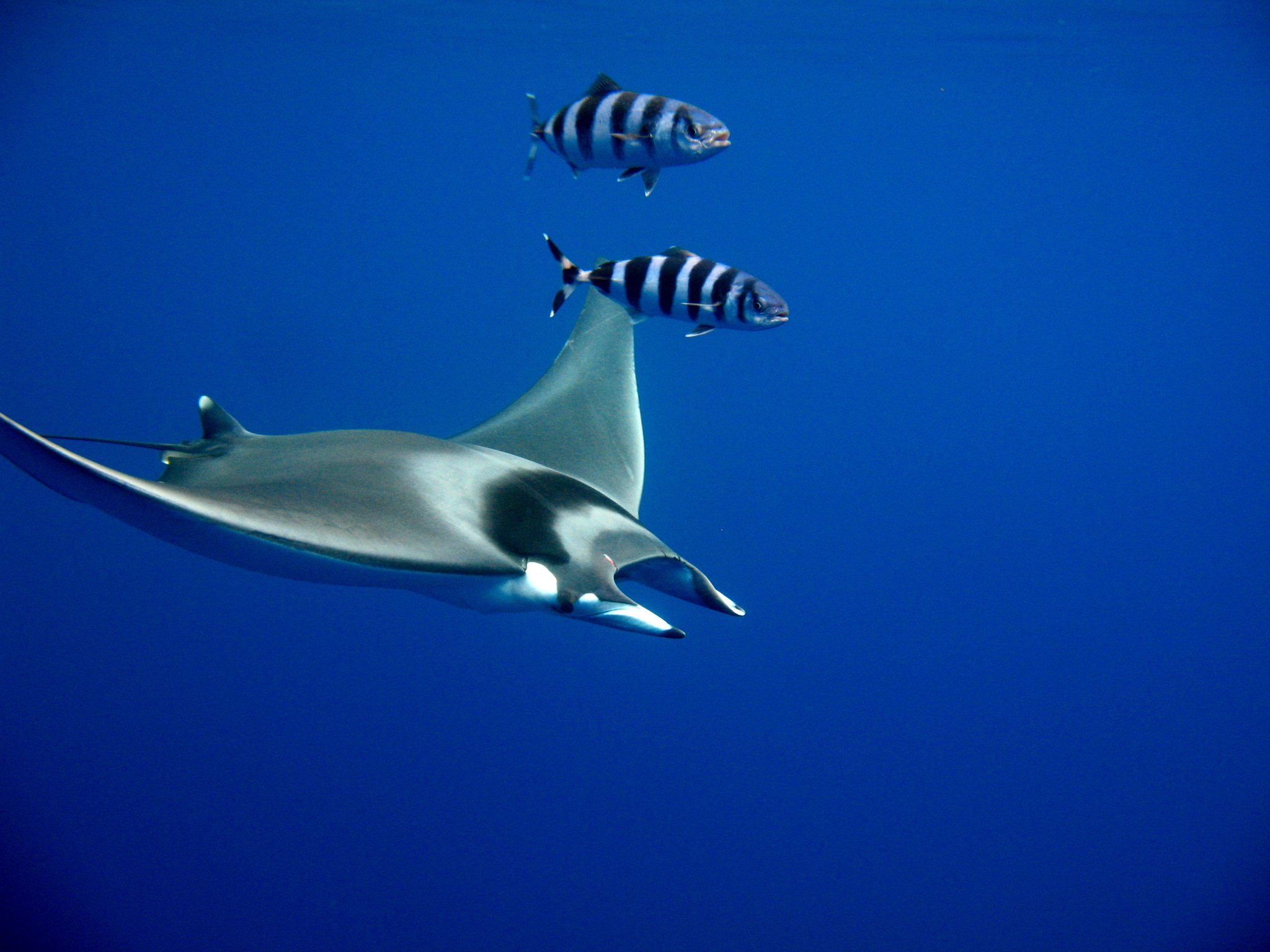
With a giant devil ray

The pilot fish's colour is between dark blue and blackish-silver, with the belly being lighter in colour. The pilot fish is also known to have a temporary variation of colour when excited; its dark-coloured bars disappear, and its body turns silvery-white, with three broad blue patches on its back. It can be recognised by its five to seven distinctive traverse bands, which are of a much darker colour than the rest of the body. The pilot fish can grow up to 60–70 cm in length.

The pilot fish is edible and is said to taste good, but it is rarely available due to its erratic behaviour when caught.

While pilot fish can be seen with all manner of sharks, they prefer accompanying the oceanic whitetip shark, Carcharhinus longimanus. The pilot fish's relationship with sharks is a mutualist one; the pilot fish gains protection from predators, while the shark gains freedom from parasites. It was often said by sailors that sharks and pilot fish share something like a "close companionship"; there were even tales of this fish following ships which had captured "their" shark for up to six weeks and showing signs of distress in its absence.

It is rare that a shark will feed on a pilot fish, and smaller pilot fish are frequently observed swimming into sharks' mouths to clean away fragments of food from between their teeth.

== Etymology and metaphors ==
There are a few possible, conflicting etymologies for the term "pilot fish". One is that seafaring peoples believed that pilot fish, which would appear around the bow of their ships when they were close to land, were leading (or piloting) them back to port. An alternative etymology is that pilot fish were once, erroneously, thought to be piloting sharks to food, or even (as legends have it) piloting ships, whales and swimmers to safety.

The pilot fish is sometimes used as a metaphor or simile; "they are like the pilot fish to the shark, serving to lead him to his victim". Pilot fish are also used as a metaphor or simile for scavengers or looters which accompany a greater threat.

== In myth ==
In Greek mythology, a sailor called Pompilus helped the nymph Ocyrhoë when she was fleeing away from the amorous god Apollo. The sailor moved the nymph from Miletus to the island of Samos and the god punished him by changing him into a pilot fish.

Pancrates of Arcadia stated that it was a sacred fish in honour to Poseidon and that it was forbidden to eat it. However, a fisherman called Epopeus ate it and paid for his audacity with his life.
