= Epigeus =

Greek character in the Iliad

In Greek mythology, Epigeus or Epeigeus (Ancient Greek: Ἐπειγεύς Epeigeus) is a Greek hero in the Iliad. He was one of the best soldiers in the Myrmidon army against Troy. Epeigeus was the son of Agacles.

== Mythology ==
Before the Trojan War, Epigeus was a king of Budeum but he killed one of his kin and fled to Peleus and Thetis. They sent Epigeus to accompany their son Achilles to Troy. During the siege, he was eventually slain by the hero Hector.

And first the Trojans drave back the bright-eyed Achaeans, for smitten was a man in no wise the worst among the Myrmidons, even the son of great-souled Agacles, goodly Epeigeus, that was king in well-peopled Budeum of old, but when he had slain a goodly man of his kin, to Peleus he came as a suppliant, and to silver-footed Thetis; and they sent him to follow with Achilles, breaker of the ranks of men, to Ilios, famed for its horses, that he might fight with the Trojans. Him, as he was laying hold of the corpse, glorious Hector smote upon the head with a stone; and his head was wholly cloven asunder within the heavy helmet, and he fell headlong upon the corpse, and death, that slayeth the spirit, was shed about him.

== Legacy ==
A Trojan asteroid, 5259 Epeigeus, has been named after him.
