= Achates (Aeneid) =

In Greek mythology, close friend of Aeneas

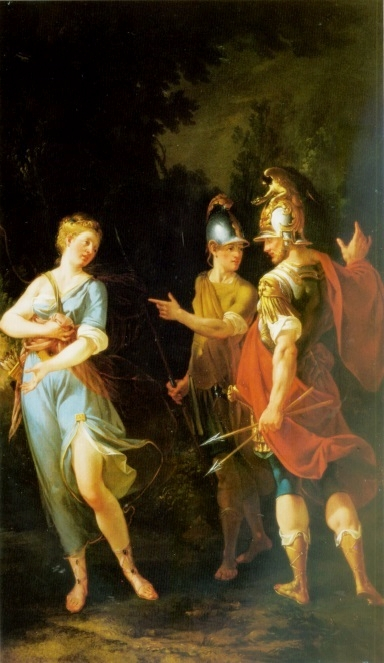
Venus appearing to Aeneas and Achates by Donato Creti (turn of the 17/18th c.)

In the Aeneid, Achates (Ancient Greek: Ἀχάτης, "good, faithful Achates", fidus Achates as he was called) was a close friend of Aeneas; his name became a by-word for a very intimate companion.

== Mythology ==
Achates accompanied Aeneas throughout his adventures, reaching Carthage with him in disguise when the pair were scouting the area, and leading him to the Sibyl of Cumae. Virgil represents him as remarkable for his fidelity, and a perennial type of that virtue. However, despite being Aeneas's most important Trojan, he is notable for his lack of character development. In fact, he has only four spoken lines in the entire epic. Aeneas, surrounded by only a shadowy cast of allies, is thus emphasised as the lone protagonist and at the same time cut off from help on his quest.

Appears in Aeneid, Book I, line(s) 120, 174, 188, 312, 459, 513, 579, 581, 644, and 656, Book III, line 523, Book VI, lines 34 and 158, Book VIII, 466, 521, and 586, Book X, 332 and 344, and Book XII, 384 and 459

== Gallery ==
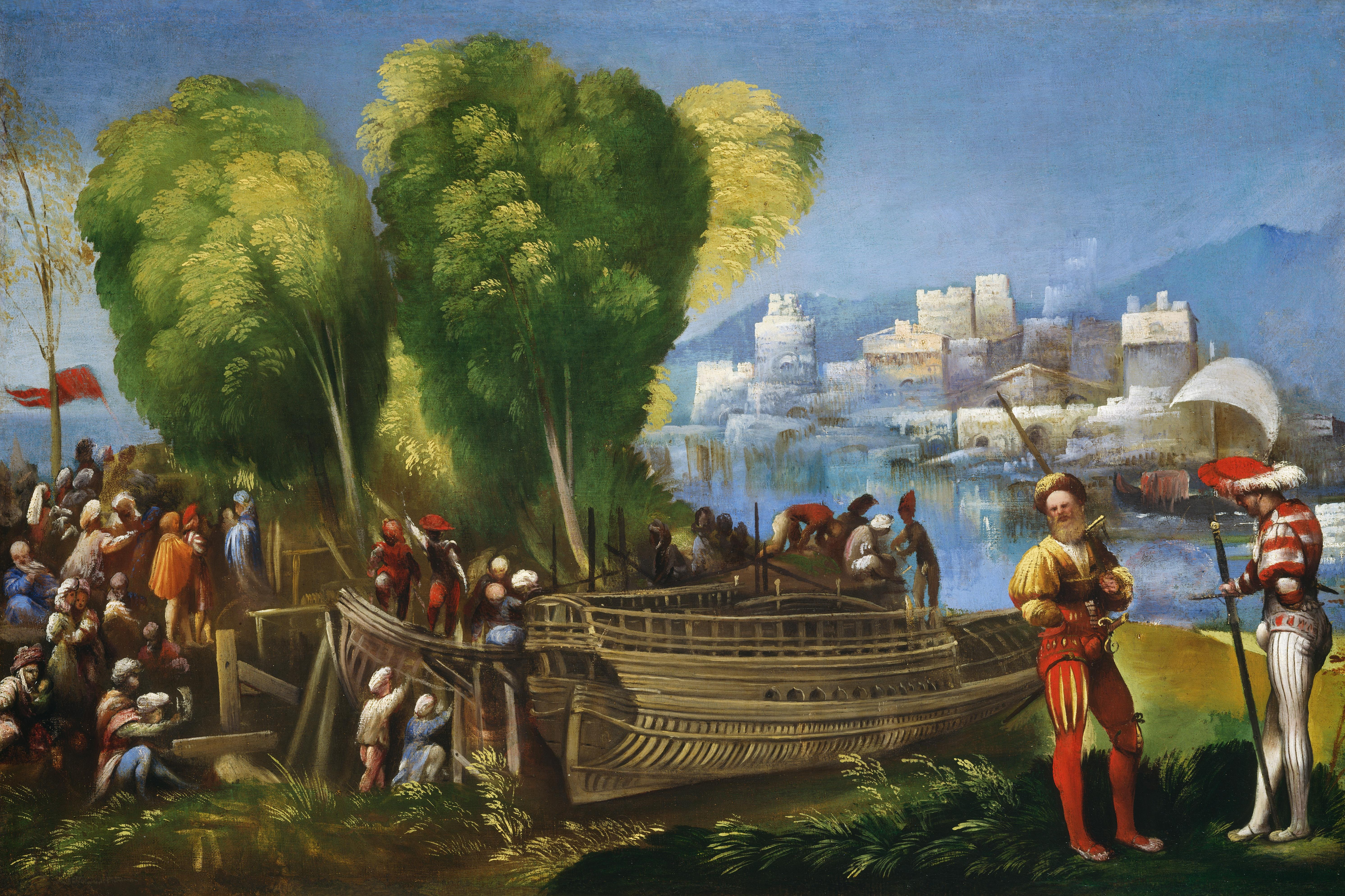
Aeneas and Achates on the Libyan Coast by Giovanni Battista Luteri Dossi (circa 1520)

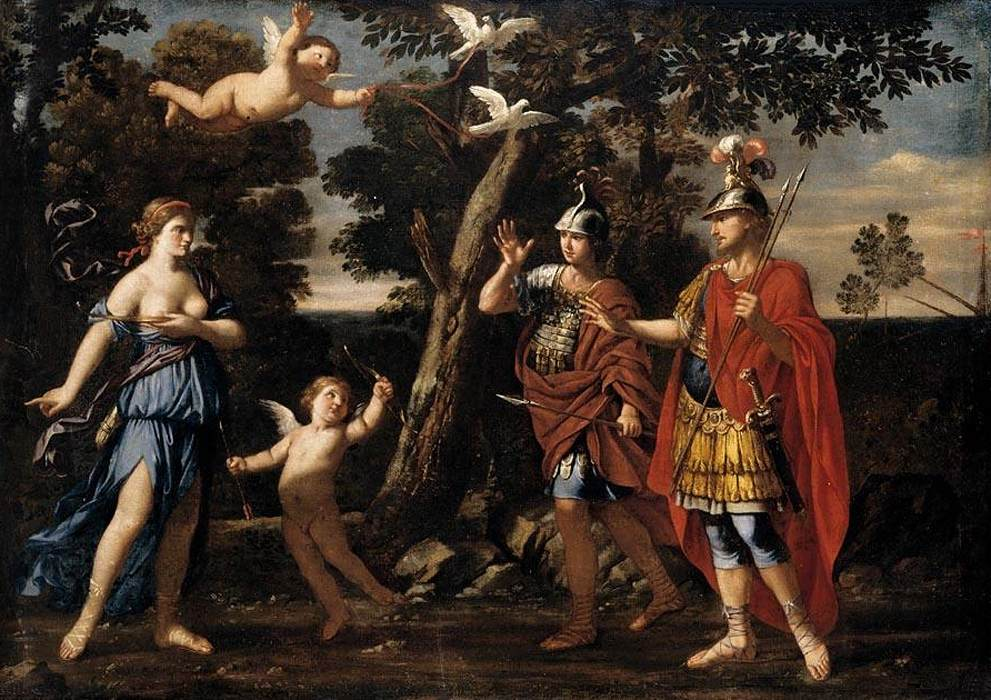
Venus Appearing to Aeneas and Achates by Giacinto Gimignani (1st half of 17th cen.)

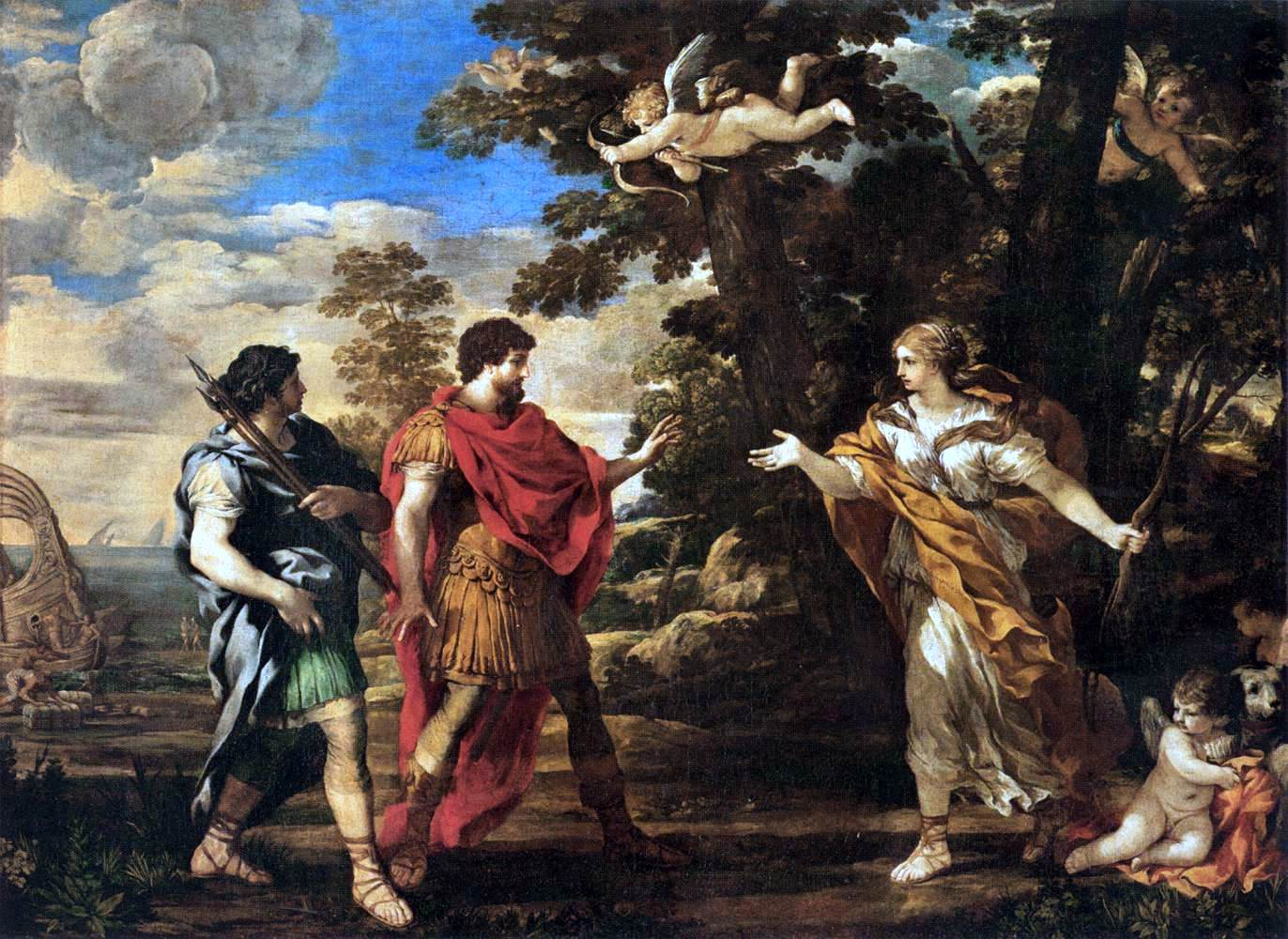
Venus as Huntress Appears to Aeneas by Pietro Da Cortona (1631)

== Legacy after Antiquity ==
The expressions fidus Achates and "faithful Achates" appear in literature, notably in the works of Proust, Jean-Jacques Rousseau, Proudhon, Walter Scott, James Joyce, and Sheridan Le Fanu.

Antoine Coypel, Aeneas and Achates Appearing to Dido (1715–1717). Musée Fabre, Montpellier.

In James Joyce's Ulysses, Episode 6, "Hades", Buck Mulligan is suggested as Stephen Dedalus's fidus Achates, while Leopold Bloom takes on that role at the beginning of Episode 16, "Eumaeus".

The Jupiter trojan asteroid 5144 Achates, discovered on 2 December 1991, was named in his honor.
