= Prylis (mythology) =

Son of Hermes and the Lesbian nymph Issa

In Greek mythology, Prylis (Ancient Greek: Πρύλις, romanized: Prulis, lit. 'dance in armour, armed dance') was a seer and son of Hermes and the Lesbian nymph Issa.

== Mythology ==
Inspired by Athene, Prylis suggested that entry to Troy could be gained by means of a wooden horse. Epeius, a carpenter, volunteered to build the horse. Afterwards Odysseus claimed all the credit for this stratagem.7543 Prylis was named after this figure in 1973.

== Interpretation ==
Simon Hornblower on Lycophron: Alexandra 220 relates:

"This story is known only from the Σ to the present passage (and was perhaps developed out of the hint at a stay on Lesbos provided by Homer's Odyssey). But it cannot have been concocted by Σ out of Lykophron by intelligent or imaginative guesswork, because the prophecy of the Wooden Horse is absent in the poem. So Prylis' prophecy must represent a genuine but otherwise lost tradition, perhaps selected by Kassandra because it reduced the hated Odysseus's role. In Apollodorus, ep. 5.14 Odysseus is actually said to have thought the idea of the horse (in Homer, Odyssey 8.493-4 Epeios makes it 'with Athena', Odysseus merely inserted it into the city; but it is easy to see how this could have been expanded by combining it with general evidence for his cunning so as to make him the actual deviser).
