= Peirous =

Trojan war leader in Greek mythology

In Greek mythology, Peirous or Peiroos (Ancient Greek: Πείροος) was a Thracian war leader from the city of Aenus and an ally of King Priam during the Trojan War. Peirous was the son of Imbrasus and father of Rhygmus (who fought at Troy alongside his father). Peirous was killed by Thoas, leader of the Aetolians.

== Namesake ==
- 2893 Peiroos, Jovian asteroid named after Peirous

== See also ==
- List of Trojan War characters
