= Halaesus =

In Greek mythology, the name Halaesus or Halesus (Latin: Alesi; Ancient Greek: Ἅλαισος, romanized: Hálaisos) may refer to:

- Halesus, the Emathian Lapith who attended the wedding of Pirithous and Hippodamia. He was killed and stripped of his armor by the Centaur Latreus during the battle between the Lapiths and the centaurs.
- Halesus, a companion of Agamemnon during the Trojan War; some state that he was an illegitimate son of Agamemnon. After the war, having escaped the massacre organized by Clytaemnestra and Aegisthus of Agamemnon and his retinue, he travelled to Italy and founded the city of Falerii (now Civita Castellana), which received its name after him. He joined Turnus in the war against Aeneas, "not because he liked Turnus but because of the hate caused by his ancient hostility (towards Aeneas)", as Servius remarks. He was killed by Pallas while defending Imaon, a fellow warrior.
