= Pompilus (mythology) =

Greek mythological character

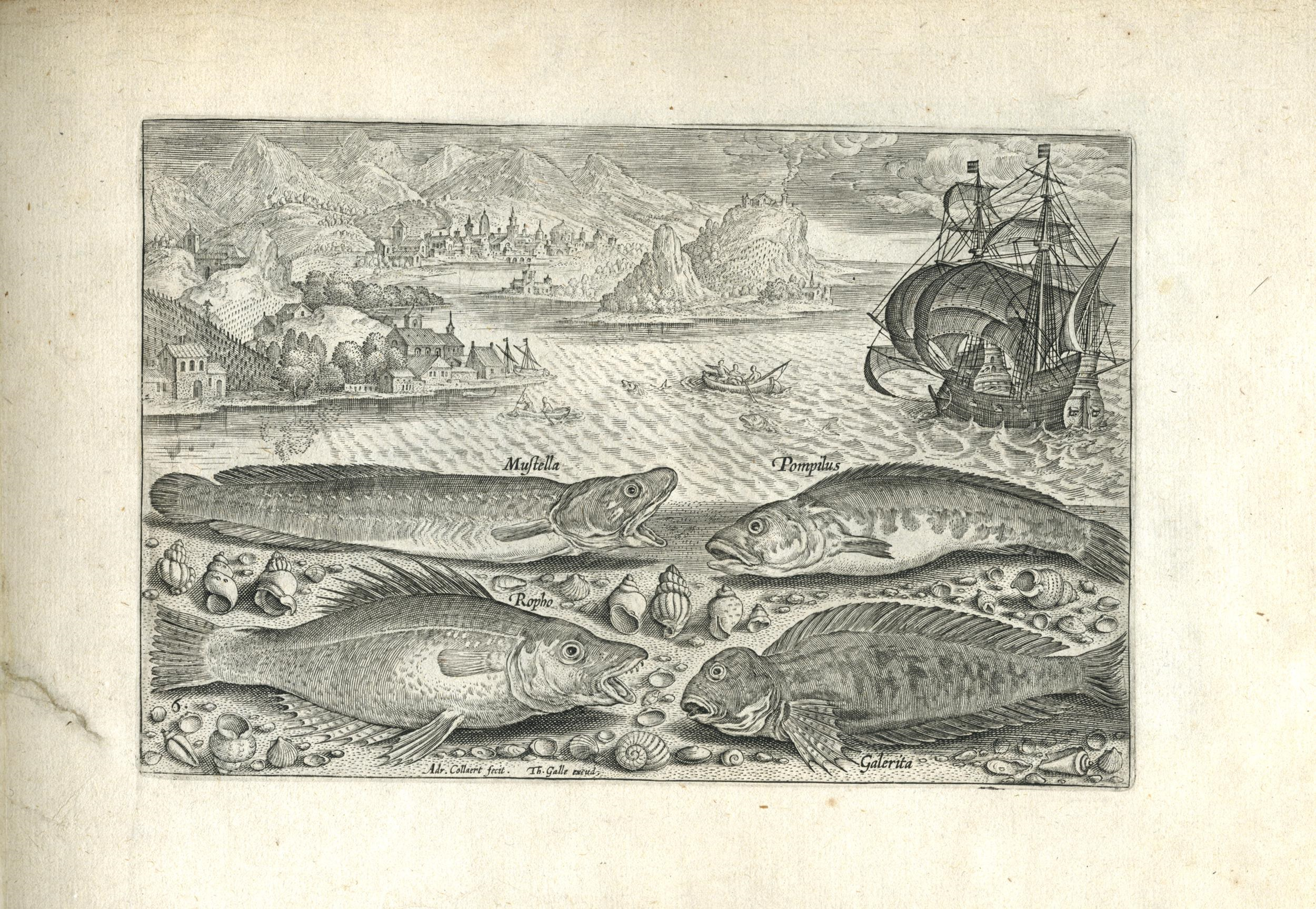
Pompilus along with three other fish, engraving by Adriaen Collaert, 1598.

Pompilus (Ancient Greek: Πομπίλος, romanized: Pompilos, lit. 'pilot fish') is a minor character in Greek mythology who incurred the wrath of the god Apollo when he foiled the god's plans as he was chasing the nymph Ocyrhoë.

== Mythology ==
During a festival in honour of Artemis in the city of Miletus, in western Asia Minor, the god Apollo became infatuated with Ocyrhoë, a young Samian nymph, daughter of a local river god in Samos. Apollo chased Ocyrhoë, but she ran away from him. Finally she reached the shore and there she ran into Pompilus, a seafarer and old family friend of her father Imbrasos. Pompilus agreed to let her board his boat, and transferred her to the nearby island of Samos.

But as they reached the coast of Samos, they found Apollo waiting for them in there. Apollo grabbed Ocyrhoë and turned Pompilus into a pilot fish as a punishment for trying to sabotage his plans. Both authors who mention this tale, Athenaeus and Claudius Aelianus, quote second century BC author Apollonius of Rhodes.

== See also ==
- Aglaurus
- Caanthus
- Psalacantha

== Bibliography ==
- Athenaeus, The Learned Banqueters, Volume V: Books 10.420e-11. Edited and translated by S. Douglas Olson. Loeb Classical Library 274. Cambridge, MA: Harvard University Press, 2009.
- Aelian, On Animals, Volume III: Books 12-17, translated by A. F. Scholfield, Loeb Classical Library No. 449, Cambridge, Massachusetts, Harvard University Press, 1959. Online version at Harvard University Press. ISBN 978-0-674-99494-2.
