= Imbrasos =

River on Samos, Greece

Imbrasos (Ancient Greek: Ἴμβρασος, Greek: Ίμβρασος Imvrasos), is a river on the Greek island of Samos. The source of the river is located on mount Ambelos (modern Ampelos or Karvounis), near the village of Pyrgos. From there it flows southeast to Myli and then enters the sea on the south side of the island at Ireo. In ancient times, it had the epithet Parthenios ('of the maiden'), because the goddess Hera was said to have been born on its bank under a lygos tree. The site became the Heraion, which was the main ancient sanctuary on the island.

The river god Imbrasos was often depicted on Samian coinage, sometimes holding a peacock. In mythology, his wife was the nymph Chesias. Their daughter, Ocyrhoë, was loved by Apollo.

== Bibliography ==
- Ludwig Bürchner: Imbrasos 1 (in German). In: Realencyclopädie der classischen Altertumswissenschaft (RE). Vol. IX,1, Stuttgart, 1914, col. 1104 f. (on the river).
- Samson Eitrem: Imbrasos 2 (in German). In: Realencyclopädie der classischen Altertumswissenschaft (RE). Vol. IX,1, Stuttgart, 1914, col. 1105 (on the river god).
