= Achaemenides =

Greek character in Virgil's Aeneid

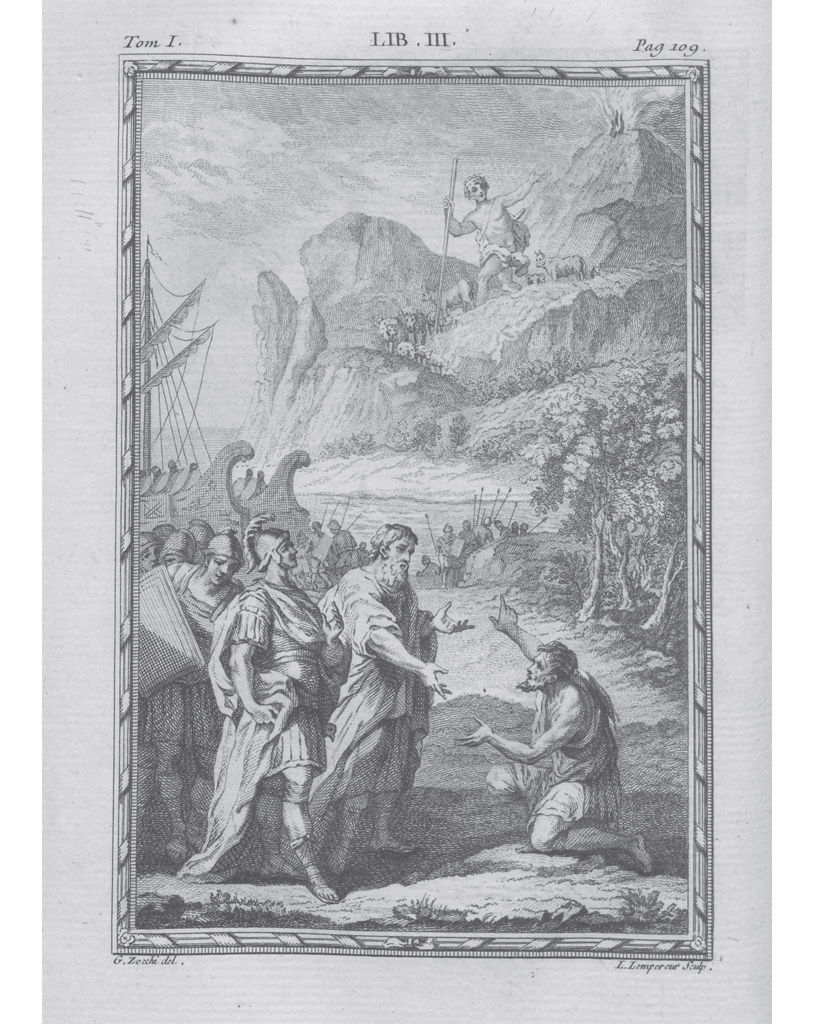

In the Aeneid of Virgil, Achaemenides (Greek: Ἀχαιμενίδης Akhaimenides) was a son of Adamastos of Ithaca, and one of Odysseus' crew. He was marooned on Sicily when Odysseus fled the Cyclops Polyphemus, until Aeneas arrived and took him to Italy with his company of refugee Trojans.

His character seems to have been chosen by Virgil treating the Persian-origin name Achaemenes as Greek and extracting the meaning "he who waits with affliction".

Although not mentioned in the Odyssey of Homer, which the Aeneid is a sequel to, Achaemenides is significant for being one of two known members of Odysseus' crew in literature to survive the return journey to Ithaca, along with Macareus (as every ship besides the flagship was destroyed by the Laestrygonian giants, and those besides Odysseus on the last ship were drowned after his men devoured Helios's sacred cattle).

The episode also provides Virgil with an opportunity to show Aeneas' magnanimity in saving a member of Odysseus' crew, and bearing no grudge for Odysseus' major role in the destruction of Troy, Aeneas' home.

== See also ==
- 5126 Achaemenides, Jovian asteroid
