= Chesias (mythology) =

Nymph in Greek mythology

In Greek mythology, Chesias (Ancient Greek: Χησιὰς, romanized: Khēsiàs) was the fairest of the nymphs, described as young and noble. She was the wife of the Samian river-god Imbrasus and by him, became the mother of Ocyrhoë, the nymph loved and abducted by Apollo. Both Chesia and Imbrasia were cult epithets used for the goddesses Artemis and Hera, the latter of which was the patron-deity of the island of Samos.
