= Ocyrhoë (Samian nymph) =

Samian woman Apollo loved

In Greek mythology Ocyrhoë (/oʊˈsɪroʊiː/; Ancient Greek: Ὠκυρόη, romanized: Ōkurhóē, lit. 'fast-flowing') is a young and beautiful maiden-nymph from the island of Samos in the eastern Aegean Sea, daughter of the local river-god Imbrasus. Ocyrhoë is notable for catching the attention of the god Apollo, and trying to escape from him by imploring the help of old family friend Pompilus. Her tale is mentioned by two authors of the Roman imperial era, Athenaeus and Claudius Aelianus.

== Family ==
The nymph Ocyrhoë was the daughter of the Samian river-god Imbrasus and the noble nymph Chesias.

== Mythology ==
Ocyrhoë grew to be a very beautiful maiden, her beauty being a gift of the Horae. She was so attractive that the god Apollo fell in love with her and made plans to ravish her.

Once she crossed the narrow strait to reach the city of Miletus on the Anatolian coast, where a festival in honour of Artemis was taking place. Apollo spotted her there, and attempted to carry her off. Ocyrhoë, afraid that such thing would happen, quickly ran to Pompilus, a ferryman and an old friend of her father's. She begged him to row her back to Samos to safety:

O Pompilus, to whose wise breast are known
The rapid depths of the hoarse roaring sea,
Show that your mind doth recollect my sire,
Who was your friend, and save his daughter now.

— Apollonius of Rhodes, The Foundation of Naucratis, quoted by Athenaeus (trans. Olson)

Pompilus agreed and Ocyrhoë boarded his boat until they reached the island. But there they found Apollo waiting for them on the shore. He snatched Ocyrhoë, and turned the boat into stone, and Pompilus himself into a pilot fish for trying to sabotage his plans.

== Culture ==
Both authors who mention the tale credit it to second-century BC Greek author Apollonius of Rhodes. Chesia and Imbrasia were both cult epithets used for Artemis and Hera, the patron-goddess of Samos. A shrine dedicated to Apollo Nymphegetes ("leader of the nymphs") and the nymphs stood near the source of the river Imbrasus in the eastern lowlands.

The story has been characterised an unusual mixture of both myth and Greek romance. The theme of Apollo pursuing the unwilling daughter of a river god echoes the story of the nymph Daphne, but the girl's flight on a ship and the locations Miletus and Samos is standard for Greek romance literature.

== See also ==
Other kidnapping victims in Greek mythology:

- Cydippe
- Persephone
- Cleothera

== Bibliography ==
- Aelian, On Animals, Volume III: Books 12-17, translated by A. F. Scholfield, Loeb Classical Library No. 449, Cambridge, Massachusetts, Harvard University Press, 1959. Online version at Harvard University Press. ISBN 978-0-674-99494-2.
- Athenaeus, The Learned Banqueters, Volume V: Books 10.420e-11. Edited and translated by S. Douglas Olson. Loeb Classical Library 274. Cambridge, MA: Harvard University Press, 2009.
- Bell, Robert E. (1991). Women of Classical Mythology: A Biographical Dictionary. ABC-Clio. ISBN 9780874365818.
- Forbes Irving, Paul M. C. (1990). Metamorphosis in Greek Myths. Clarendon Press. ISBN 0-19-814730-9.
- Grimal, Pierre (1987). The Dictionary of Classical Mythology. Wiley-Blackwell. ISBN 0-631-13209-0.
- Käppel, Lutz (October 1, 2006). "Ocyr(r)hoe". In Cancik, Hubert; Schneider, Helmuth (eds.). Brill's New Pauly. Translated by Christine F. Salazar. Kiel: Brill Reference Online. ISSN 1574-9347.
- Stoll, Heinrich Wilhelm (1909). Roscher, Wilhelm Heinrich (ed.). Ausführliches Lexikon der griechischen und römischen Mythologie [Detailed dictionary of Greek and Roman mythology] (in German). Vol. III: N–P. Leipzig: Teubner-Verlag.
- Shipley, Graham (1987). A History of Samos, 800–188 BC. Oxford, UK: Clarendon Press. ISBN 0-19-814868-2.
- Stephens, Susan A., ed. (2015). Callimachus: The Hymns. UK, US: Oxford University Press. ISBN 978-0-19-978304-5.
