= 4060 Deipylos =

Jupiter trojan asteroid

Discovery
- Discovered by: E. W. Elst; G. Pizarro
- Discovery site: La Silla Obs.
- Discovery date: 17 December 1987

Designations
- Pronunciation: /diːˈɪpɪləs/
- Named after: Deipylos (Greek mythology)
- Alternative designations: 1987 YT_{1} · 1942 ET; 1950 UJ · 1951 YP_{1} 1966 FN
- Minor planet category: Jupiter trojan Greek · background
- Adjectives: Deipylian

Orbital characteristics
- Epoch 23 March 2018 (JD 2458200.5)
- Uncertainty parameter 0
- Observation arc: 75.63 yr (27,624 d)
- Aphelion: 6.0549 AU
- Perihelion: 4.4428 AU
- Semi-major axis: 5.2488 AU
- Eccentricity: 0.1536
- Orbital period (sidereal): 12.03 yr (4,392 d)
- Mean anomaly: 166.69°
- Mean motion: 0° 4^{m} 55.2^{s} / day
- Inclination: 16.148°
- Longitude of ascending node: 168.21°
- Argument of perihelion: 307.50°
- Jupiter MOID: 0.5481 AU
- T_{Jupiter}: 2.8980

Physical characteristics
- Mean diameter: 66.34 km (calculated); 79.21±4.3 km 84.04±0.57 km 86.79±3.10 km
- Synodic rotation period: 9.19±0.02 h (Note: Lightcurve plots of (4060) Deipylos from 2015, 2016 and 2017 by Robert Stephens at the Center for Solar System Studies (U81). Quality code is 3/3-/3- (lightcurve rating at CS3). Summary figures at the LCDB.); 9.297±0.007 h 9.298±0.007 h 9.38±0.02 h 11.490±0.0037 h
- Geometric albedo: 0.043±0.003; 0.057 (assumed); 0.067±0.005; 0.0776±0.009
- Spectral type: C (S3OS2-TH); C/b (S3OS2-BB); C (assumed); V–I = 0.760±0.018
- Absolute magnitude (H): 8.90; 9.169±0.002 (R); 9.3; 9.37±0.28; 9.4; 9.62

4060 Deipylos /diːˈɪpɪləs/ is a large Jupiter trojan from the Greek camp, approximately 84 kilometers (52 miles) in diameter. It was discovered on 17 December 1987, by astronomers Eric Elst and Guido Pizarro at ESO's La Silla Observatory in northern Chile. The transitional C-type asteroid belongs to the 40 largest Jupiter trojans and has rotation period of 9.3 hours. It was named after Deipylos from Greek mythology.

== Orbit and classification ==
Deipylos is a dark Jovian asteroid orbiting in the leading Greek camp at Jupiter's L_{4} Lagrangian point, 60° ahead its orbit in a 1:1 resonance (see Trojans in astronomy). It is a non-family asteroid in the Jovian background population. It orbits the Sun at a distance of 4.4–6.1 AU once every 12.03 years (4,392 days; semi-major axis of 5.25 AU). Its orbit has an eccentricity of 0.15 and an inclination of 16° with respect to the ecliptic.

The body's observation arc begins with its first observation as 1942 ET at Turku Observatory in March 1942yxz years prior to its official discovery observation.

== Physical characteristics ==
Deipylos has been characterized as a carbonaceous C-type asteroid in the Tholen-like taxonomy of the Small Solar System Objects Spectroscopic Survey (S3OS2). In their SMASS-like taxonomy, S3OS2 classified Deipylos as an Cb-subtype that transitions to the somewhat brighter B-type asteroids. The Collaborative Asteroid Lightcurve Link also assumes it to be of carbonaceous composition.

=== Rotation period ===
In December 2010, a rotational lightcurve of Deipylos was obtained from photometric observations in the R-band by astronomers at the Palomar Transient Factory in California. Lightcurve analysis gave a rotation period of 11.490 hours with a brightness amplitude of 0.11 magnitude (U=2) Between 2015 and 2017, several observations by Robert Stephens in collaboration with Daniel Coley and Brian Warner at the Center for Solar System Studies (U81) in California gave a more refined period between 9.19 and 9.38 hours and an amplitude of 0.07–0.13 magnitude (U=3-/3-/3-/2+). The best-rated result gave 9.298 hours with an amplitude of 0.07±0.02 magnitude.

=== Diameter and albedo ===
According to the surveys carried out by the Infrared Astronomical Satellite IRAS, the Japanese Akari satellite and the NEOWISE mission of NASA's Wide-field Infrared Survey Explorer, Deipylos measures between 79.21 and 86.79 kilometers in diameter and its surface has an albedo between 0.043 and 0.078. CALL assumes a standard albedo for a carbonaceous asteroid of 0.057 and calculates a diameter of 66.34 kilometers based on an absolute magnitude of 9.62.

100+ largest Jupiter trojans

Largest Jupiter Trojans by survey^{(A)} (mean-diameter in kilometers; RP: rotation period in hours; YoD: Year of Discovery)
| Designation | H | WISE | IRAS | Akari | Ln | RP | V–I | YoD | Ref |
|---|---|---|---|---|---|---|---|---|---|
| 624 Hektor | 7.2 | 225 | 233 | 230.99 | L4 | 6.92 | 0.930 | 1907 | list |
| 617 Patroclus | 8.19 | 140.362 | 140.92 | 140.85 | L5 | 102.80 | 0.830 | 1906 | list |
| 911 Agamemnon | 7.89 | 131.038 | 166.66 | 185.30 | L4 | 6.59 | 0.980 | 1919 | list |
| 588 Achilles | 8.67 | 130.099 | 135.47 | 133.22 | L4 | 7.31 | 0.940 | 1906 | list |
| 3451 Mentor | 8.4 | 126.288 | 116.30 | 117.91 | L5 | 7.70 | 0.770 | 1984 | list |
| 3317 Paris | 8.3 | 118.790 | 116.26 | 120.45 | L5 | 7.09 | 0.950 | 1984 | list |
| 1867 Deiphobus | 8.3 | 118.220 | 122.67 | 131.31 | L5 | 58.66 | 0.930 | 1971 | list |
| 1172 Äneas | 8.33 | 118.020 | 142.82 | 148.66 | L5 | 8.71 | 0.950 | 1930 | list |
| 1437 Diomedes | 8.3 | 117.786 | 164.31 | 172.60 | L4 | 24.49 | 0.810 | 1937 | list |
| 1143 Odysseus | 7.93 | 114.624 | 125.64 | 130.81 | L4 | 10.11 | 0.860 | 1930 | list |
| 2241 Alcathous | 8.64 | 113.682 | 114.63 | 118.87 | L5 | 7.69 | 0.940 | 1979 | list |
| 659 Nestor | 8.99 | 112.320 | 108.87 | 107.06 | L4 | 15.98 | 0.790 | 1908 | list |
| 3793 Leonteus | 8.7 | 112.046 | 86.26 | 87.58 | L4 | 5.62 | 0.780 | 1985 | list |
| 3063 Makhaon | 8.4 | 111.655 | 116.14 | 114.34 | L4 | 8.64 | 0.830 | 1983 | list |
| 1583 Antilochus | 8.6 | 108.842 | 101.62 | 111.69 | L4 | 31.54 | 0.950 | 1950 | list |
| 884 Priamus | 8.81 | 101.093 | 96.29 | 119.99 | L5 | 6.86 | 0.900 | 1917 | list |
| 1208 Troilus | 8.99 | 100.477 | 103.34 | 111.36 | L5 | 56.17 | 0.740 | 1931 | list |
| 1173 Anchises | 8.89 | 99.549 | 126.27 | 120.49 | L5 | 11.60 | 0.780 | 1930 | list |
| 2207 Antenor | 8.89 | 97.658 | 85.11 | 91.32 | L5 | 7.97 | 0.950 | 1977 | list |
| 2363 Cebriones | 9.11 | 95.976 | 81.84 | 84.61 | L5 | 20.05 | 0.910 | 1977 | list |
| 4063 Euforbo | 8.7 | 95.619 | 102.46 | 106.38 | L4 | 8.85 | 0.950 | 1989 | list |
| 2357 Phereclos | 8.94 | 94.625 | 94.90 | 98.45 | L5 | 14.39 | 0.960 | 1981 | list |
| 4709 Ennomos | 8.5 | 91.433 | 80.85 | 80.03 | L5 | 12.28 | 0.690 | 1988 | list |
| 2797 Teucer | 8.7 | 89.430 | 111.14 | 113.99 | L4 | 10.15 | 0.920 | 1981 | list |
| 2920 Automedon | 8.8 | 88.574 | 111.01 | 113.11 | L4 | 10.21 | 0.950 | 1981 | list |
| 15436 Dexius | 9.1 | 87.646 | 85.71 | 78.63 | L4 | 8.97 | 0.870 | 1998 | list |
| 3596 Meriones | 9.2 | 87.380 | 75.09 | 73.28 | L4 | 12.96 | 0.830 | 1985 | list |
| 2893 Peiroos | 9.23 | 86.884 | 87.46 | 86.76 | L5 | 8.96 | 0.950 | 1975 | list |
| 4086 Podalirius | 9.1 | 85.495 | 86.89 | 85.98 | L4 | 10.43 | 0.870 | 1985 | list |
| 4060 Deipylos | 9.3 | 84.043 | 79.21 | 86.79 | L4 | 9.30 | 0.760 | 1987 | list |
| 1404 Ajax | 9.3 | 83.990 | 81.69 | 96.34 | L4 | 29.38 | 0.960 | 1936 | list |
| 4348 Poulydamas | 9.5 | 82.032 | 70.08 | 87.51 | L5 | 9.91 | 0.840 | 1988 | list |
| 5144 Achates | 9.0 | 80.958 | 91.91 | 89.85 | L5 | 5.96 | 0.920 | 1991 | list |
| 4833 Meges | 8.9 | 80.165 | 87.33 | 89.39 | L4 | 14.25 | 0.940 | 1989 | list |
| 2223 Sarpedon | 9.41 | 77.480 | 94.63 | 108.21 | L5 | 22.74 | 0.880 | 1977 | list |
| 4489 Dracius | 9.0 | 76.595 | 92.93 | 95.02 | L4 | 12.58 | 0.950 | 1988 | list |
| 2260 Neoptolemus | 9.31 | 76.435 | 71.65 | 81.28 | L4 | 8.18 | 0.950 | 1975 | list |
| 5254 Ulysses | 9.2 | 76.147 | 78.34 | 80.00 | L4 | 28.72 | 0.970 | 1986 | list |
| 3708 Socus | 9.3 | 75.661 | 79.59 | 76.75 | L5 | 6.55 | 0.980 | 1974 | list |
| 2674 Pandarus | 9.1 | 74.267 | 98.10 | 101.72 | L5 | 8.48 | 1.000 | 1982 | list |
| 3564 Talthybius | 9.4 | 73.730 | 68.92 | 74.11 | L4 | 40.59 | 0.900 | 1985 | list |
| 4834 Thoas | 9.1 | 72.331 | 86.82 | 96.21 | L4 | 18.19 | 0.950 | 1989 | list |
| 7641 Cteatus | 9.4 | 71.839 | 68.97 | 75.28 | L4 | 27.77 | 0.980 | 1986 | list |
| 3540 Protesilaos | 9.3 | 70.225 | 76.84 | 87.66 | L4 | 8.95 | 0.940 | 1973 | list |
| 11395 Iphinous | 9.8 | 68.977 | 64.71 | 67.78 | L4 | 17.38 | – | 1998 | list |
| 4035 Thestor | 9.6 | 68.733 | 68.23 | 66.99 | L4 | 13.47 | 0.970 | 1986 | list |
| 5264 Telephus | 9.4 | 68.472 | 73.26 | 81.38 | L4 | 9.53 | 0.970 | 1991 | list |
| 1868 Thersites | 9.5 | 68.163 | 70.08 | 78.89 | L4 | 10.48 | 0.960 | 1960 | list |
| 9799 Thronium | 9.6 | 68.033 | 64.87 | 72.42 | L4 | 21.52 | 0.910 | 1996 | list |
| 4068 Menestheus | 9.5 | 67.625 | 62.37 | 68.46 | L4 | 14.40 | 0.950 | 1973 | list |
| 23135 Pheidas | 9.9 | 66.230 | 58.29 | 68.50 | L4 | 8.69 | 0.860 | 2000 | list |
| 2456 Palamedes | 9.3 | 65.916 | 91.66 | 99.60 | L4 | 7.24 | 0.920 | 1966 | list |
| 3709 Polypoites | 9.1 | 65.297 | 99.09 | 85.23 | L4 | 10.04 | 1.000 | 1985 | list |
| 1749 Telamon | 9.5 | 64.898 | 81.06 | 69.14 | L4 | 16.98 | 0.970 | 1949 | list |
| 3548 Eurybates | 9.6 | 63.885 | 72.14 | 68.40 | L4 | 8.71 | 0.730 | 1973 | list |
| 4543 Phoinix | 9.7 | 63.836 | 62.79 | 69.54 | L4 | 38.87 | 1.200 | 1989 | list |
| 12444 Prothoon | 9.8 | 63.835 | 64.31 | 62.41 | L5 | 15.82 | – | 1996 | list |
| 4836 Medon | 9.5 | 63.277 | 67.73 | 78.70 | L4 | 9.82 | 0.920 | 1989 | list |
| 16070 Charops | 9.7 | 63.191 | 64.13 | 68.98 | L5 | 20.24 | 0.960 | 1999 | list |
| 15440 Eioneus | 9.6 | 62.519 | 66.48 | 71.88 | L4 | 21.43 | 0.970 | 1998 | list |
| 4715 Medesicaste | 9.7 | 62.097 | 63.91 | 65.93 | L5 | 8.81 | 0.850 | 1989 | list |
| 34746 Thoon | 9.8 | 61.684 | 60.51 | 63.63 | L5 | 19.63 | 0.950 | 2001 | list |
| 38050 Bias | 9.8 | 61.603 | 61.04 | 50.44 | L4 | 18.85 | 0.990 | 1998 | list |
| 5130 Ilioneus | 9.7 | 60.711 | 59.40 | 52.49 | L5 | 14.77 | 0.960 | 1989 | list |
| 5027 Androgeos | 9.6 | 59.786 | 57.86 | n.a. | L4 | 11.38 | 0.910 | 1988 | list |
| 6090 Aulis | 9.4 | 59.568 | 74.53 | 81.92 | L4 | 18.48 | 0.980 | 1989 | list |
| 5648 Axius | 9.7 | 59.295 | 63.91 | n.a. | L5 | 37.56 | 0.900 | 1990 | list |
| 7119 Hiera | 9.7 | 59.150 | 76.40 | 77.29 | L4 | 400 | 0.950 | 1989 | list |
| 4805 Asteropaios | 10.0 | 57.647 | 53.16 | 43.44 | L5 | 12.37 | – | 1990 | list |
| 16974 Iphthime | 9.8 | 57.341 | 55.43 | 57.15 | L4 | 78.9 | 0.960 | 1998 | list |
| 4867 Polites | 9.8 | 57.251 | 58.29 | 64.29 | L5 | 11.24 | 1.010 | 1989 | list |
| 2895 Memnon | 10.0 | 56.706 | 55.67 | n.a. | L5 | 7.50 | 0.710 | 1981 | list |
| 4708 Polydoros | 9.9 | 54.964 | 55.67 | n.a. | L5 | 7.52 | 0.960 | 1988 | list |
| 21601 Aias | 10.0 | 54.909 | 55.67 | 56.08 | L4 | 12.65 | 0.970 | 1998 | list |
| 12929 Periboea | 9.9 | 54.077 | 61.04 | 55.34 | L5 | 9.27 | 0.880 | 1999 | list |
| 17492 Hippasos | 10.0 | 53.975 | 55.67 | n.a. | L5 | 17.75 | – | 1991 | list |
| 5652 Amphimachus | 10.1 | 53.921 | 53.16 | 52.48 | L4 | 8.37 | 1.050 | 1992 | list |
| 2759 Idomeneus | 9.9 | 53.676 | 61.01 | 52.55 | L4 | 32.38 | 0.910 | 1980 | list |
| 5258 Rhoeo | 10.2 | 53.275 | 50.77 | n.a. | L4 | 19.85 | 1.010 | 1989 | list |
| 12126 Chersidamas | 10.1 | 53.202 | n.a. | n.a. | L5 | n.a. | ? | 1999 | list |
| 15502 Hypeirochus | 10.0 | 53.100 | 55.67 | 50.86 | L5 | 15.13 | 0.875 | 1999 | list |
| 4754 Panthoos | 10.0 | 53.025 | 53.15 | 56.96 | L5 | 27.68 | – | 1977 | list |
| 4832 Palinurus | 10.0 | 52.058 | 53.16 | n.a. | L5 | 5.32 | 1.000 | 1988 | list |
| 5126 Achaemenides | 10.5 | 51.922 | 44.22 | 48.57 | L4 | 53.02 | – | 1989 | list |
| 3240 Laocoon | 10.2 | 51.695 | 50.77 | n.a. | L5 | 11.31 | 0.880 | 1978 | list |
| 4902 Thessandrus | 9.8 | 51.263 | 61.04 | 71.79 | L4 | 738 | 0.960 | 1989 | list |
| 11552 Boucolion | 10.1 | 51.136 | 53.16 | 53.91 | L5 | 32.44 | – | 1993 | list |
| 20729 Opheltius | 10.4 | 50.961 | 46.30 | n.a. | L4 | 5.72 | 1.000 | 1999 | list |
| 6545 Leitus | 10.1 | 50.951 | 53.16 | n.a. | L4 | 16.26 | 0.910 | 1986 | list |
| 4792 Lykaon | 10.1 | 50.870 | 53.16 | n.a. | L5 | 40.09 | 0.960 | 1988 | list |
| 21900 Orus | 10.0 | 50.810 | 55.67 | 53.87 | L4 | 13.45 | 0.950 | 1999 | list |
| 1873 Agenor | 10.1 | 50.799 | 53.76 | 54.38 | L5 | 20.60 | – | 1971 | list |
| 5028 Halaesus | 10.2 | 50.770 | 50.77 | n.a. | L4 | 24.94 | 0.900 | 1988 | list |
| 2146 Stentor | 9.9 | 50.755 | 58.29 | n.a. | L4 | 16.40 | – | 1976 | list |
| 4722 Agelaos | 10.0 | 50.378 | 53.16 | 59.47 | L5 | 18.44 | 0.910 | 1977 | list |
| 5284 Orsilocus | 10.1 | 50.159 | 53.16 | n.a. | L4 | 10.31 | 0.970 | 1989 | list |
| 11509 Thersilochos | 10.1 | 49.960 | 53.16 | 56.23 | L5 | 17.37 | – | 1990 | list |
| 5285 Krethon | 10.1 | 49.606 | 58.53 | 52.61 | L4 | 12.04 | 1.090 | 1989 | list |
| 4791 Iphidamas | 10.1 | 49.528 | 57.85 | 59.96 | L5 | 9.70 | 1.030 | 1988 | list |
| 9023 Mnesthus | 10.1 | 49.151 | 50.77 | 60.80 | L5 | 30.66 | – | 1988 | list |
| 5283 Pyrrhus | 9.7 | 48.356 | 64.58 | 69.93 | L4 | 7.32 | 0.950 | 1989 | list |
| 4946 Askalaphus | 10.2 | 48.209 | 52.71 | 66.10 | L4 | 22.73 | 0.940 | 1988 | list |
| 22149 Cinyras | 10.2 | 48.190 | 50.77 | 50.37 | L4 | 7.84 | 1.090 | 2000 | list |
| 32496 Deïopites | 10.2 | 48.017 | 50.77 | 51.63 | L5 | 23.34 | 0.950 | 2000 | list |
| 5120 Bitias | 10.2 | 47.987 | 50.77 | n.a. | L5 | 15.21 | 0.780 | 1988 | list |
| 12714 Alkimos | 10.1 | 47.819 | 61.04 | 54.62 | L4 | 28.48 | – | 1991 | list |
| 7352 Hypsenor | 9.9 | 47.731 | 55.67 | 47.07 | L5 | 648 | 0.850 | 1994 | list |
| 1870 Glaukos | 10.6 | 47.649 | 42.23 | n.a. | L5 | 5.99 | — | 1971 | list |
| 4138 Kalchas | 10.1 | 46.462 | 53.16 | 61.04 | L4 | 29.2 | 0.810 | 1973 | list |
| 23958 Theronice | 10.2 | 46.001 | 50.77 | 47.91 | L4 | 562 | 0.990 | 1998 | list |
| 4828 Misenus | 10.4 | 45.954 | 46.30 | 43.22 | L5 | 12.87 | 0.920 | 1988 | list |
| 4057 Demophon | 10.1 | 45.683 | 53.16 | n.a. | L4 | 29.82 | 1.060 | 1985 | list |
| 4501 Eurypylos | 10.4 | 45.524 | 46.30 | n.a. | L4 | 6.05 | – | 1989 | list |
| 4007 Euryalos | 10.3 | 45.515 | 48.48 | 53.89 | L4 | 6.39 | – | 1973 | list |
| 5259 Epeigeus | 10.3 | 44.741 | 42.59 | 44.42 | L4 | 18.42 | – | 1989 | list |
| 30705 Idaios | 10.4 | 44.546 | 46.30 | n.a. | L5 | 15.74 | – | 1977 | list |
| 16560 Daitor | 10.7 | 43.861 | 51.42 | 43.38 | L5 | – | – | 1991 | list |
| 15977 Pyraechmes | 10.4 | 43.530 | 46.30 | 51.53 | L5 | 250 | 0.906 | 1998 | list |
| 7543 Prylis | 10.6 | 42.893 | 42.23 | n.a. | L4 | 17.80 | – | 1973 | list |
| 4827 Dares | 10.5 | 42.770 | 44.22 | n.a. | L5 | 19.00 | – | 1988 | list |
| 1647 Menelaus | 10.5 | 42.716 | 44.22 | n.a. | L4 | 17.74 | 0.866 | 1957 | list |
^{(A)} Used sources: WISE/NEOWISE catalog (NEOWISE_DIAM_V1 PDS, Grav, 2012); IRAS data (SIMPS v.6 catalog); and Akari catalog (Usui, 2011); RP: rotation period and V–I (color index) taken from the LCDB Note: missing data was completed with figures from the JPL SBDB (query) and from the LCDB (query form) for the WISE/NEOWISE and SIMPS catalogs, respectively. These figures are given in italics. Also, listing is incomplete above #100.

== Naming ==
This minor planet was named after Deipylos a Greek hero in the Trojan War. He was a fellow of Sthenelus (Sthenelos), who ordered him to bring the horses captured from Aeneas to the Greek vessels. The official naming citation was published by the Minor Planet Center on 15 September 1989 (M.P.C. 15090).
