= 17365 Thymbraeus =

Jupiter trojan asteroid

Discovery
- Discovered by: Eleanor F. Helin; Schelte J. Bus
- Discovery site: Palomar Obs.
- Discovery date: 7 November 1978

Designations
- Alternative designations: 1978 VF_{11} · 1998 MM_{49} · 1999 RE_{121}
- Minor planet category: Jupiter trojan Trojan (L_{5})

Orbital characteristics
- Epoch 13 September 2023 (JD 2460200.5)
- Uncertainty parameter 0
- Observation arc: 68.79 yr (25,125 days)
- Earliest precovery date: 23 November 1954
- Aphelion: 5.683 AU
- Perihelion: 4.856 AU
- Semi-major axis: 5.270 AU
- Eccentricity: 0.0785
- Orbital period (sidereal): 12.10 yr (4,418 days)
- Mean anomaly: 321.875°
- Mean motion: 0° 4^{m} 53.321^{s} / day
- Inclination: 11.644°
- Longitude of ascending node: 252.124°
- Argument of perihelion: 117.711°

Physical characteristics
- Mean diameter: 44.904±0.525 km
- Mean density: 0.830±0.050 g/cm^{3}
- Synodic rotation period: 12.671821 h (retrograde) or 12.672607 h (prograde)
- North pole right ascension: 92°±2° (retrograde) or 268°±2° (prograde)
- North pole declination: −77°±2° (retrograde) or +77°±2° (prograde)
- Geometric albedo: 0.066±0.009
- Absolute magnitude (H): 10.59±0.04

17365 Thymbraeus (provisional designation 1978 VF_{11}) is a Jupiter trojan from the Trojan camp, which is located in Jupiter's trailing L_{5} Lagrangian point.

== Background ==
It was discovered by Eleanor Helin and Schelte Bus at Palomar Observatory on 7 November 1978. Thymbraeus is 45 kilometres (28 mi) in diameter and has an elongated dumbbell shape that is on the verge of splitting apart due to centrifugal forces of its rapid rotation. The asteroid's density is less than that of water, indicating that it has a highly porous interior structure similar to a rubble pile. It was given the name Thymbraeus on 27 February 2023, after one of the two sons of the Trojan priest Laocoön who was attacked by sea serpents for attempting to warn the Trojans about the Trojan horse in Greek mythology.
