= 617 Patroclus =

Jupiter trojan asteroid

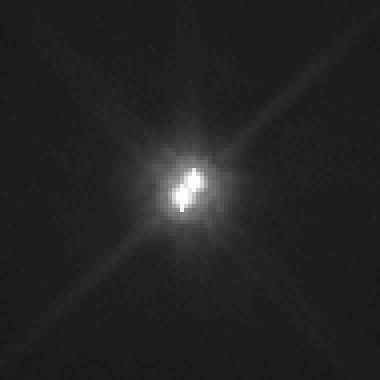
- Hubble Space Telescope image composite of Patroclus and its companion Menoetius, taken in 2018

Discovery
- Discovered by: A. Kopff
- Discovery site: Heidelberg Obs.
- Discovery date: 17 October 1906

Designations
- Pronunciation: /pəˈtroʊkləs/
- Named after: Πάτροκλος Patroklos (Greek mythology)
- Alternative designations: 1906 VY · 1941 XC; 1962 NB
- Minor planet category: Jupiter trojan Trojan · background
- Adjectives: Patroclean /pætrəˈkliːən/

Orbital characteristics
- Epoch 25 February 2023 (JD 2460000.5)
- Uncertainty parameter 0
- Aphelion: 5.937 AU
- Perihelion: 4.480 AU
- Semi-major axis: 5.209 AU
- Eccentricity: 0.1399
- Orbital period (sidereal): 11.89 yr (4,342 d)
- Mean anomaly: 319.506°
- Mean motion: 0° 4^{m} 58.464^{s} / day
- Inclination: 22.062°
- Longitude of ascending node: 44.360°
- Argument of perihelion: 308.306°
- Known satellites: 1 (Menoetius)
- Jupiter MOID: 0.1868 AU
- T_{Jupiter}: 2.835

Physical characteristics
- Dimensions: 127 km × 117 km × 98 km (primary only)
- Mean diameter: 113±3 km (primary only); 106±11 km (primary only); 154 km (effective combined diameter); 145±15 km (effective combined diameter)
- Volume: 1.36×10^{6} km^{3}
- Mass: (1.424±0.018)×10^{18} kg
- Mean density: 1.05±0.21 g/cm^{3}
- Sidereal rotation period: 4.282753±0.000023 d (doubly synchronous)
- Geometric albedo: 0.045±0.009
- Spectral type: D (Tholen); C0 (Barucci); D (Tedesco); U–B = 0.215±0.045; B–V = 0.710±0.050; V–R = 0.420±0.030; V–I = 0.830±0.020
- Absolute magnitude (H): 8.22; 8.19; 8.18

617 Patroclus (/pəˈtroʊkləs/ pə-TROH-kləs) is a large binary Jupiter trojan asteroid. It is a dark D-type asteroid and a slow rotator, due to the 103-hour orbital period of its two components. It is one of five Jupiter trojan asteroids targeted by the Lucy space probe, and is scheduled for a flyby in 2033.

Patroclus was discovered on 17 October 1906, by astronomer August Kopff at the Heidelberg Observatory in Germany, and was named after Patroclus in Greek mythology. It was the second trojan to be discovered and the only member of the Trojan camp named after a Greek figure, as the convention of naming one 'camp' after Greek figures of the Trojan War and the other after Trojan figures had not yet been established.

Patroclus was long thought to be one of the largest Jupiter trojans, with a diameter on the order of 150 km. However, in 2001 it was discovered to be a binary asteroid of two similarly sized objects. The name Patroclus is now assigned to the larger component, some 110–115 km in diameter, while the secondary, slightly smaller at 100–105 km in diameter, has been named Menoetius (/mɪˈniːʃəs/ mə-NEE-shəs). (Note: Buie (2015). Volume equivalent diameters based on derived ellipsods are: Patroclus: 113 km and Menoetius: 104 km, while for the combined system, a mean-diameter of 154 km is given. Measured by asteroid occultation. Other observations gave a combined diameter of 140 kilometers. Summary figures for (617) Patroclus at the LCDB.) This was the first discovery of a binary trojan asteroid.

== Orbit ==
Patroclus orbits in Jupiter's trailing Lagrangian point, L_{5}, in an area called the Trojan camp after one of the sides in the legendary Trojan War (the other node, at the L_{4} point, is called the "Greek camp").

It orbits the Sun at a distance of 4.5–5.9 AU once every 11 years and 11 months (4,353 days). Its orbit has an eccentricity of 0.14 and an inclination of 22° with respect to the ecliptic. The asteroid's observation arc begins at the discovering Heidelberg Observatory in November 1906, about 3 weeks after its official discovery observation.

== Binary system ==
Hubble images of Patroclus and Menoetius orbiting each other, from May to June 2017

Artist's conception of Patroclus and Menoetius orbiting around their center of mass, occasionally eclipsing one another

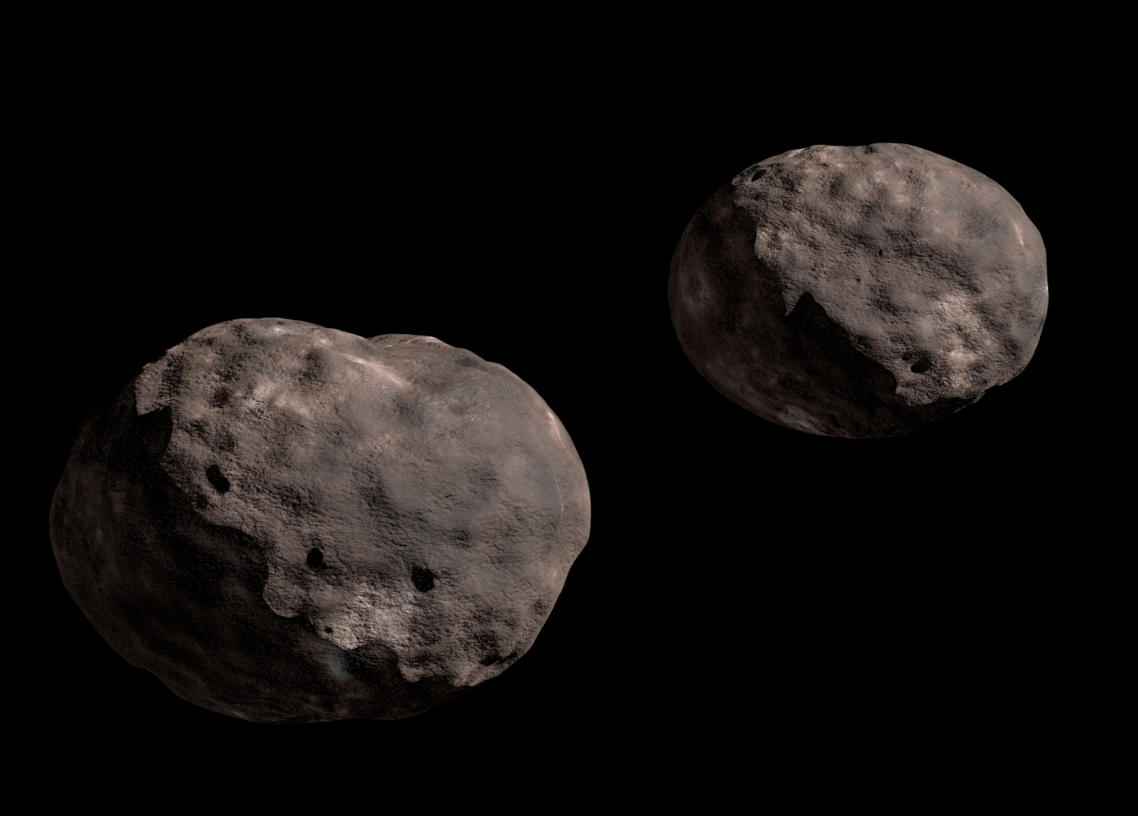
Artist's impression of the Patroclus–Menoetius binary system

Menoetius
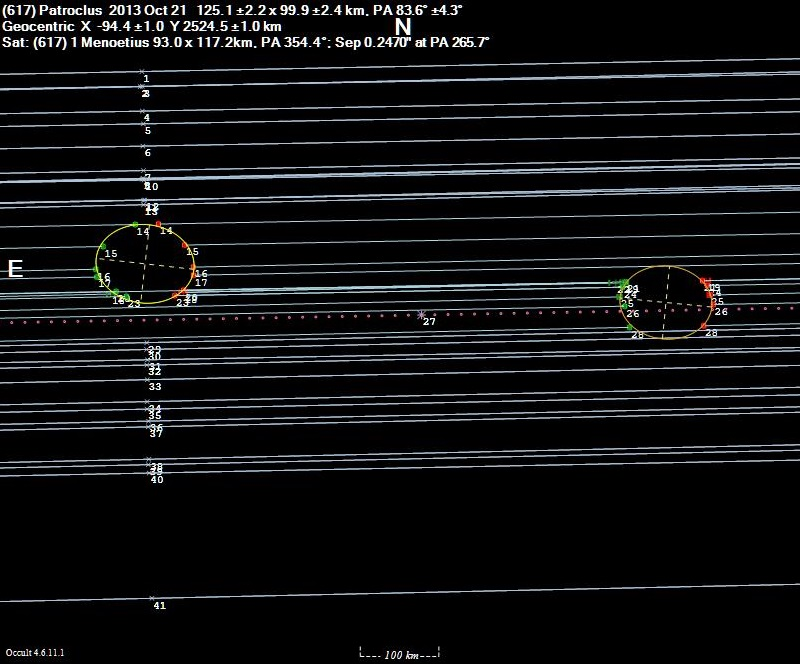
- Plot of the results of the multi-chord stellar occultation by 617 Patroclus and Menoetius

Discovery
- Discovery date: 2001

Designations
- Pronunciation: /mɪˈniːʃəs/
- Named after: Menoetius (Greek mythology)
- Adjectives: Menoetian /mɪˈniːʃən/)

Orbital characteristics
- Epoch 2005 February 26 00:00:00 TDB
- Semi-major axis: 692.5±4.0 km
- Eccentricity: 0.004±0.004
- Orbital period (sidereal): 4.282753±0.000023 d
- Inclination: 152.4°±0.2°
- Satellite of: Patroclus

Physical characteristics
- Dimensions: 117 km × 108 km × 90 km
- Mean diameter: 104±3 km 98±10 km

In 2001, it was discovered that Patroclus is a binary system, made up of two components of roughly similar size. It is one of six Trojan asteroids believed to be binary. In 2006, accurate measurements of the orbit from the Keck Laser guide star adaptive optics system were reported.

It was estimated that the two components orbit around their center of mass in 4.283±0.004 days at a distance of 680±20 km in a roughly circular orbit. Combining these observations with thermal measurements taken in 2000, the sizes of the components of the system were estimated at 106 km and 98 km, with an equivalent whole-system diameter of 145 km, refined by later measurements from the Keck Observatory to approximately 122 km and 112 km for each partner, and a co-orbital period of 103.5±0.3 hours (4.3125±0.0125 days).

On 21 October 2013, both bodies occulted a magnitude 8.8 star as observed by a team of 41 observers stationed across the USA. Observation data put the orbital distance at the time of 664.6 km (with an unstated uncertainty), and give a size for the slightly larger component, which retains the name Patroclus with overall volume equivalent to a 113±3 km–diameter sphere, with the smaller component now named Menoetius with a volume equivalent to a 104±3 km–diameter sphere.

== Physical characteristics ==
=== Lightcurves ===
Since 1989, several rotational lightcurves of Patroclus have been obtained from photometric observations. Analysis of the best rated lightcurves gave a rotation period between 102.8 and 103.5 hours with a brightness amplitude of less than 0.1 magnitude (U=2/3/). A low brightness variation typically indicates that a body has a nearly spheroidal shape. Its long rotation period makes it a slow rotator.

=== Diameter and albedo ===
According to the surveys carried out by the Infrared Astronomical Satellite IRAS and NASA's Wide-field Infrared Survey Explorer with its subsequent NEOWISE mission, the Patroclus system has an effective combined size between 140.36 and 140.92 kilometers in diameter and its surface has an albedo of 0.047. The Collaborative Asteroid Lightcurve Link adopts the results obtained by IRAS, that is, an albedo of 0.0471 and a diameter of 140.92 kilometers based on an absolute magnitude of 8.19.

=== Composition ===
Recent evidence suggests that the objects are icy like comets, rather than rocky like most asteroids. In the Tholen classification, Patroclus is a dark P-type asteroid.

Because the density of the components (0.88 g/cm^{3}) is less than water and about one third that of rock, it was suggested that the Patroclus system, previously thought to be a pair of rocky asteroids, is more similar to a comet in composition. It is suspected that many Jupiter trojans are in fact small planetesimals captured in the Lagrange point of the Jupiter–Sun system during the migration of the giant planets 3.9 billion years ago. This scenario was proposed by A. Morbidelli and colleagues in a series of articles published in May 2005 in Nature.

== Exploration ==
Animation of Lucy's trajectory around Sun Lucy · Sun · Earth · 52246 Donaldjohanson · 3548 Eurybates · 21900 Orus · 617 Patroclus

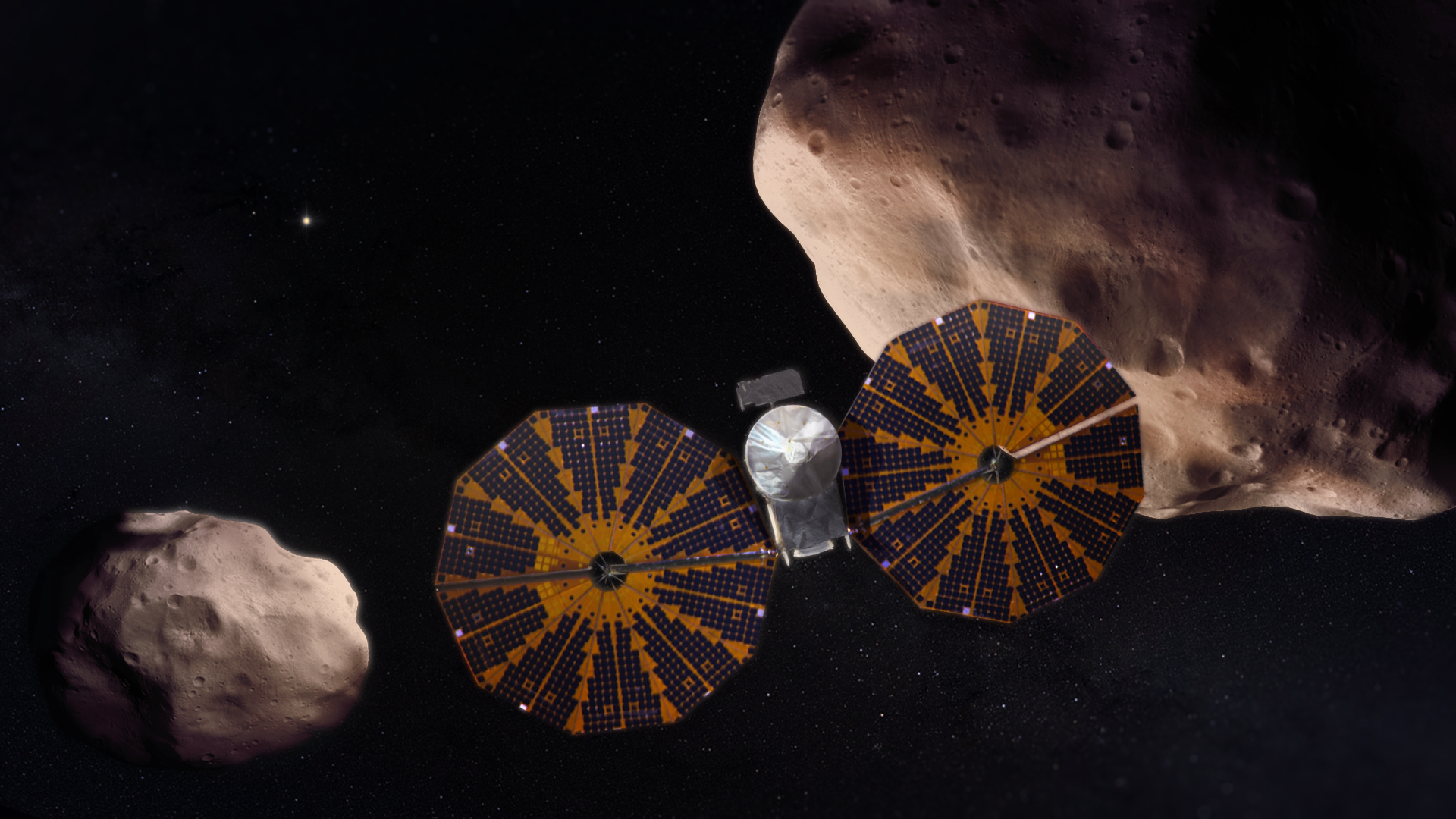
Artist's impression of the Lucy spacecraft flying past the Patroclus–Menoetius system

The Patroclus–Menoetius system is a scheduled target for Lucy, a flyby mission to multiple asteroids, mostly Jupiter trojans.

== Name ==
This minor planet was named after the legendary Greek hero Patroclus. Friend of Achilles, he was killed by Hector during the Trojan War. (See 588 Achilles and 624 Hektor.) The name was proposed by Austrian astronomer Johann Palisa. The official naming citation was mentioned in The Names of the Minor Planets by Paul Herget in 1955 (H 65).

In Greek and thus in Latin, Patroclus has all short vowels. Thus the expected English pronunciation would be with stress on the 'a', */ˈpætrəkləs/. However, Alexander Pope shifted the stress to the first 'o', /pəˈtroʊkləs/, a convention from Latin poetry, (Note: This poetic exception to normal Latin stress assignment is used for metrical convenience in Latin, and Pope retained it in his English translation. It is available when the final syllable starts with a sequence of two consonants, the first a plosive (a b c d g p or t) and the second a liquid (an l or an r).) for metrical convenience in his verse translation of Homer, and this irregular pronunciation has become established in English.

The satellite Menoetius (/məˈniːʃəs/ mə-NEE-shəs; official designation (617) Patroclus I Menoetius) was named after the legendary father of Patroclus. It was previously known by the provisional designation S/2001 (617) 1.

Patroclus and Menoetius are the only objects in the Trojan camp to be named after Greek rather than Trojan characters. The naming conventions for the Jupiter trojans were not adopted until after Patroclus was named (similarly, the asteroid Hektor is the only Trojan character to appear in the Greek camp).
