= List of minor planets: 38001–39000 =

The following is a partial list of minor planets, running from minor-planet number 38001 through 39000, inclusive. The primary data for this and other partial lists is based on JPL's "Small-Body Orbital Elements" and data available from the Minor Planet Center. Critical list information is also provided by the MPC, unless otherwise specified from Lowell Observatory. A detailed description of the table's columns and additional sources are given on the main page including a complete list of every page in this series, and a statistical break-up on the dynamical classification of minor planets.

Also see the summary list of all named bodies in numerical and alphabetical order, and the corresponding naming citations for the number range of this particular list. New namings may only be added to this list after official publication, as the preannouncement of names is condemned by the Working Group for Small Bodies Nomenclature of the International Astronomical Union.

Near-Earth obj.	MBA (inner)	MBA (outer)	Centaur
Mars-crosser	MBA (middle)	Jupiter trojan	Trans-Neptunian obj.
Unclassified

== 38001–38100 ==
Designation			Discovery			Properties		Ref
Permanent	Provisional	Named after	Date	Site	Discoverer(s)	Category	Diam.	Ref
38001	1998 KM_{37}	—	May 22, 1998	Socorro	LINEAR	·	4.9 km	MPC · JPL
38002	1998 KO_{42}	—	May 27, 1998	Anderson Mesa	LONEOS	·	6.4 km	MPC · JPL
38003	1998 KH_{44}	—	May 22, 1998	Socorro	LINEAR	·	8.0 km	MPC · JPL
38004	1998 KJ_{47}	—	May 22, 1998	Socorro	LINEAR	·	4.3 km	MPC · JPL
38005	1998 KM_{47}	—	May 22, 1998	Socorro	LINEAR	·	14 km	MPC · JPL
38006	1998 KD_{48}	—	May 22, 1998	Socorro	LINEAR	EUN	4.0 km	MPC · JPL
38007	1998 KS_{49}	—	May 23, 1998	Socorro	LINEAR	MAR	2.6 km	MPC · JPL
38008	1998 KP_{50}	—	May 23, 1998	Socorro	LINEAR	·	4.6 km	MPC · JPL
38009	1998 KV_{50}	—	May 23, 1998	Socorro	LINEAR	EUN	4.7 km	MPC · JPL
38010	1998 KE_{51}	—	May 23, 1998	Socorro	LINEAR	EUN	4.0 km	MPC · JPL
38011	1998 KL_{52}	—	May 23, 1998	Socorro	LINEAR	·	4.6 km	MPC · JPL
38012	1998 KE_{54}	—	May 23, 1998	Socorro	LINEAR	·	2.8 km	MPC · JPL
38013	1998 KY_{54}	—	May 23, 1998	Socorro	LINEAR	·	3.5 km	MPC · JPL
38014	1998 KO_{61}	—	May 23, 1998	Socorro	LINEAR	EUN	2.8 km	MPC · JPL
38015	1998 KX_{63}	—	May 22, 1998	Socorro	LINEAR	·	8.2 km	MPC · JPL
38016	1998 KV_{65}	—	May 27, 1998	Socorro	LINEAR	(194)	4.7 km	MPC · JPL
38017	1998 KW_{67}	—	May 26, 1998	Socorro	LINEAR	·	5.1 km	MPC · JPL
38018 Louisneefs	1998 LN_{2}	Louisneefs	June 1, 1998	La Silla	E. W. Elst	·	8.0 km	MPC · JPL
38019 Jeanmariepelt	1998 LV_{2}	Jeanmariepelt	June 1, 1998	La Silla	E. W. Elst	·	12 km	MPC · JPL
38020 Hannadam	1998 MP	Hannadam	June 17, 1998	San Marcello	L. Tesi, A. Boattini	·	4.9 km	MPC · JPL
38021	1998 MG_{1}	—	June 16, 1998	Kitt Peak	Spacewatch	AGN	3.7 km	MPC · JPL
38022	1998 MS_{7}	—	June 19, 1998	Caussols	ODAS	·	3.9 km	MPC · JPL
38023	1998 MO_{39}	—	June 26, 1998	La Silla	E. W. Elst	·	4.7 km	MPC · JPL
38024 Melospadafora	1998 OB	Melospadafora	July 16, 1998	Caussols	ODAS	·	6.4 km	MPC · JPL
38025	1998 QF	—	August 17, 1998	Prescott	P. G. Comba	·	11 km	MPC · JPL
38026	1998 QC_{12}	—	August 17, 1998	Socorro	LINEAR	·	5.3 km	MPC · JPL
38027	1998 QE_{14}	—	August 17, 1998	Socorro	LINEAR	EOS	6.9 km	MPC · JPL
38028	1998 QC_{20}	—	August 17, 1998	Socorro	LINEAR	·	7.8 km	MPC · JPL
38029	1998 QZ_{24}	—	August 17, 1998	Socorro	LINEAR	·	9.2 km	MPC · JPL
38030	1998 QG_{33}	—	August 17, 1998	Socorro	LINEAR	·	5.8 km	MPC · JPL
38031	1998 QN_{36}	—	August 17, 1998	Socorro	LINEAR	·	8.9 km	MPC · JPL
38032	1998 QH_{43}	—	August 17, 1998	Socorro	LINEAR	·	6.6 km	MPC · JPL
38033	1998 QN_{49}	—	August 17, 1998	Socorro	LINEAR	·	11 km	MPC · JPL
38034	1998 QW_{57}	—	August 30, 1998	Kitt Peak	Spacewatch	EOS	5.4 km	MPC · JPL
38035	1998 QC_{85}	—	August 24, 1998	Socorro	LINEAR	·	11 km	MPC · JPL
38036 Waynewarren	1998 RE_{1}	Waynewarren	September 13, 1998	Reedy Creek	J. Broughton	·	9.3 km	MPC · JPL
38037	1998 RS_{18}	—	September 14, 1998	Socorro	LINEAR	·	5.7 km	MPC · JPL
38038	1998 RQ_{19}	—	September 14, 1998	Socorro	LINEAR	·	10 km	MPC · JPL
38039	1998 RD_{24}	—	September 14, 1998	Socorro	LINEAR	THM	8.4 km	MPC · JPL
38040	1998 RW_{49}	—	September 14, 1998	Socorro	LINEAR	·	12 km	MPC · JPL
38041	1998 RQ_{79}	—	September 14, 1998	Socorro	LINEAR	HYG	9.1 km	MPC · JPL
38042	1998 SA_{10}	—	September 21, 1998	Catalina	CSS	·	12 km	MPC · JPL
38043	1998 SB_{26}	—	September 22, 1998	Anderson Mesa	LONEOS	EUN	4.7 km	MPC · JPL
38044 Michaellucas	1998 SL_{62}	Michaellucas	September 19, 1998	Anderson Mesa	LONEOS	H	1.6 km	MPC · JPL
38045	1998 SM_{93}	—	September 26, 1998	Socorro	LINEAR	·	11 km	MPC · JPL
38046 Krasnoyarsk	1998 SW_{144}	Krasnoyarsk	September 20, 1998	La Silla	E. W. Elst	3:2 · SHU	16 km	MPC · JPL
38047	1998 TC_{3}	—	October 14, 1998	Catalina	CSS	H	2.1 km	MPC · JPL
38048 Blumenbach	1998 UL_{18}	Blumenbach	October 27, 1998	Catalina	CSS	H	1.8 km	MPC · JPL
38049	1998 VY_{6}	—	November 11, 1998	Socorro	LINEAR	H	1.3 km	MPC · JPL
38050 Bias	1998 VR_{38}	Bias	November 10, 1998	Socorro	LINEAR	L4	62 km	MPC · JPL
38051	1998 XJ_{5}	—	December 7, 1998	Višnjan Observatory	K. Korlević	L4	20 km	MPC · JPL
38052	1998 XA_{7}	—	December 8, 1998	Kitt Peak	Spacewatch	L4	20 km	MPC · JPL
38053	1998 XO_{62}	—	December 11, 1998	Socorro	LINEAR	H	1.3 km	MPC · JPL
38054	1999 AG_{10}	—	January 14, 1999	Višnjan Observatory	K. Korlević	·	2.8 km	MPC · JPL
38055	1999 AC_{24}	—	January 15, 1999	Catalina	CSS	H	1.7 km	MPC · JPL
38056	1999 BZ_{10}	—	January 20, 1999	Caussols	ODAS	·	2.1 km	MPC · JPL
38057	1999 BO_{15}	—	January 26, 1999	Višnjan Observatory	K. Korlević	·	5.6 km	MPC · JPL
38058	1999 CA_{35}	—	February 10, 1999	Socorro	LINEAR	·	3.6 km	MPC · JPL
38059	1999 CO_{38}	—	February 10, 1999	Socorro	LINEAR	·	2.7 km	MPC · JPL
38060	1999 CB_{61}	—	February 12, 1999	Socorro	LINEAR	·	2.0 km	MPC · JPL
38061	1999 DJ_{1}	—	February 17, 1999	Socorro	LINEAR	H	1.3 km	MPC · JPL
38062	1999 EC_{9}	—	March 15, 1999	Kitt Peak	Spacewatch	·	3.9 km	MPC · JPL
38063	1999 FH	—	March 16, 1999	Višnjan Observatory	K. Korlević, M. Jurić	slow	3.4 km	MPC · JPL
38064	1999 FZ_{10}	—	March 17, 1999	Kitt Peak	Spacewatch	·	1.9 km	MPC · JPL
38065	1999 FK_{19}	—	March 22, 1999	Anderson Mesa	LONEOS	·	3.9 km	MPC · JPL
38066	1999 FO_{19}	—	March 22, 1999	Anderson Mesa	LONEOS	·	3.8 km	MPC · JPL
38067	1999 FO_{31}	—	March 19, 1999	Socorro	LINEAR	EUN	7.1 km	MPC · JPL
38068	1999 FK_{32}	—	March 19, 1999	Socorro	LINEAR	·	4.2 km	MPC · JPL
38069	1999 GN	—	April 5, 1999	Višnjan Observatory	K. Korlević	·	2.3 km	MPC · JPL
38070 Redwine	1999 GG_{2}	Redwine	April 6, 1999	Anderson Mesa	LONEOS	·	3.7 km	MPC · JPL
38071	1999 GU_{3}	—	April 10, 1999	Socorro	LINEAR	AMO · PHA · slow	430 m	MPC · JPL
38072	1999 GO_{11}	—	April 11, 1999	Kitt Peak	Spacewatch	·	2.4 km	MPC · JPL
38073	1999 GX_{11}	—	April 11, 1999	Kitt Peak	Spacewatch	·	2.2 km	MPC · JPL
38074	1999 GX_{19}	—	April 15, 1999	Socorro	LINEAR	·	2.6 km	MPC · JPL
38075	1999 GN_{21}	—	April 15, 1999	Socorro	LINEAR	·	5.0 km	MPC · JPL
38076	1999 GA_{31}	—	April 7, 1999	Socorro	LINEAR	·	1.8 km	MPC · JPL
38077	1999 GY_{31}	—	April 7, 1999	Socorro	LINEAR	·	1.6 km	MPC · JPL
38078	1999 GW_{42}	—	April 12, 1999	Socorro	LINEAR	·	5.7 km	MPC · JPL
38079	1999 HF	—	April 16, 1999	Xinglong	SCAP	PHO · moon	3.4 km	MPC · JPL
38080	1999 HN_{1}	—	April 17, 1999	Socorro	LINEAR	·	2.2 km	MPC · JPL
38081	1999 HC_{10}	—	April 17, 1999	Socorro	LINEAR	·	3.1 km	MPC · JPL
38082	1999 HO_{11}	—	April 17, 1999	Catalina	CSS	·	1.5 km	MPC · JPL
38083 Rhadamanthus	1999 HX_{11}	Rhadamanthus	April 17, 1999	Kitt Peak	Deep Ecliptic Survey	other TNO	145 km	MPC · JPL
38084	1999 HB_{12}	—	April 18, 1999	Kitt Peak	M. W. Buie, Millis, R.	res · 2:5	145 km	MPC · JPL
38085	1999 HO_{12}	—	April 17, 1999	Socorro	LINEAR	PHO	2.3 km	MPC · JPL
38086 Beowulf	1999 JB	Beowulf	May 5, 1999	Anderson Mesa	LONEOS	APO +1km	640 m	MPC · JPL
38087	1999 JN	—	May 6, 1999	Gekko	T. Kagawa	·	3.6 km	MPC · JPL
38088	1999 JS_{1}	—	May 8, 1999	Catalina	CSS	·	5.9 km	MPC · JPL
38089	1999 JV_{1}	—	May 8, 1999	Catalina	CSS	EUN	5.2 km	MPC · JPL
38090	1999 JN_{2}	—	May 8, 1999	Catalina	CSS	·	2.3 km	MPC · JPL
38091	1999 JT_{3}	—	May 10, 1999	Anderson Mesa	LONEOS	AMO +1km	2.5 km	MPC · JPL
38092	1999 JF_{5}	—	May 10, 1999	Socorro	LINEAR	·	1.8 km	MPC · JPL
38093	1999 JX_{6}	—	May 8, 1999	Catalina	CSS	V	1.9 km	MPC · JPL
38094	1999 JM_{9}	—	May 8, 1999	Catalina	CSS	·	1.7 km	MPC · JPL
38095	1999 JD_{10}	—	May 8, 1999	Catalina	CSS	·	2.3 km	MPC · JPL
38096	1999 JF_{11}	—	May 9, 1999	Višnjan Observatory	K. Korlević	MAS	2.2 km	MPC · JPL
38097	1999 JW_{11}	—	May 12, 1999	Socorro	LINEAR	PHO	2.6 km	MPC · JPL
38098	1999 JO_{13}	—	May 10, 1999	Socorro	LINEAR	·	3.2 km	MPC · JPL
38099	1999 JE_{14}	—	May 13, 1999	Socorro	LINEAR	·	2.8 km	MPC · JPL
38100	1999 JM_{14}	—	May 15, 1999	Socorro	LINEAR	·	1.4 km	MPC · JPL

== 38101–38200 ==
back to top

Designation			Discovery			Properties		Ref
Permanent	Provisional	Named after	Date	Site	Discoverer(s)	Category	Diam.	Ref
38101	1999 JE_{15}	—	May 15, 1999	Catalina	CSS	·	1.6 km	MPC · JPL
38102	1999 JM_{18}	—	May 10, 1999	Socorro	LINEAR	·	1.9 km	MPC · JPL
38103	1999 JM_{19}	—	May 10, 1999	Socorro	LINEAR	·	3.1 km	MPC · JPL
38104	1999 JL_{20}	—	May 10, 1999	Socorro	LINEAR	·	1.8 km	MPC · JPL
38105	1999 JB_{21}	—	May 10, 1999	Socorro	LINEAR	(2076)	2.0 km	MPC · JPL
38106	1999 JG_{23}	—	May 10, 1999	Socorro	LINEAR	·	2.8 km	MPC · JPL
38107	1999 JZ_{23}	—	May 10, 1999	Socorro	LINEAR	·	1.7 km	MPC · JPL
38108	1999 JB_{24}	—	May 10, 1999	Socorro	LINEAR	·	2.6 km	MPC · JPL
38109	1999 JQ_{24}	—	May 10, 1999	Socorro	LINEAR	·	3.0 km	MPC · JPL
38110	1999 JH_{25}	—	May 10, 1999	Socorro	LINEAR	·	3.8 km	MPC · JPL
38111	1999 JQ_{26}	—	May 10, 1999	Socorro	LINEAR	·	1.8 km	MPC · JPL
38112	1999 JZ_{29}	—	May 10, 1999	Socorro	LINEAR	·	4.0 km	MPC · JPL
38113	1999 JB_{30}	—	May 10, 1999	Socorro	LINEAR	·	2.6 km	MPC · JPL
38114	1999 JO_{34}	—	May 10, 1999	Socorro	LINEAR	·	1.7 km	MPC · JPL
38115	1999 JJ_{35}	—	May 10, 1999	Socorro	LINEAR	·	1.4 km	MPC · JPL
38116	1999 JK_{35}	—	May 10, 1999	Socorro	LINEAR	·	2.3 km	MPC · JPL
38117	1999 JH_{36}	—	May 10, 1999	Socorro	LINEAR	·	6.7 km	MPC · JPL
38118	1999 JS_{36}	—	May 10, 1999	Socorro	LINEAR	·	2.9 km	MPC · JPL
38119	1999 JN_{37}	—	May 10, 1999	Socorro	LINEAR	V	3.8 km	MPC · JPL
38120	1999 JN_{39}	—	May 10, 1999	Socorro	LINEAR	NYS ·	4.7 km	MPC · JPL
38121	1999 JO_{42}	—	May 10, 1999	Socorro	LINEAR	·	2.5 km	MPC · JPL
38122	1999 JC_{43}	—	May 10, 1999	Socorro	LINEAR	·	2.3 km	MPC · JPL
38123	1999 JD_{43}	—	May 10, 1999	Socorro	LINEAR	·	2.8 km	MPC · JPL
38124	1999 JV_{43}	—	May 10, 1999	Socorro	LINEAR	·	2.5 km	MPC · JPL
38125	1999 JG_{44}	—	May 10, 1999	Socorro	LINEAR	·	5.6 km	MPC · JPL
38126	1999 JT_{44}	—	May 10, 1999	Socorro	LINEAR	·	2.9 km	MPC · JPL
38127	1999 JL_{45}	—	May 10, 1999	Socorro	LINEAR	·	2.4 km	MPC · JPL
38128	1999 JN_{45}	—	May 10, 1999	Socorro	LINEAR	·	2.2 km	MPC · JPL
38129	1999 JV_{45}	—	May 10, 1999	Socorro	LINEAR	·	2.2 km	MPC · JPL
38130	1999 JY_{45}	—	May 10, 1999	Socorro	LINEAR	·	2.7 km	MPC · JPL
38131	1999 JR_{47}	—	May 10, 1999	Socorro	LINEAR	NYS	2.2 km	MPC · JPL
38132	1999 JX_{47}	—	May 10, 1999	Socorro	LINEAR	·	1.8 km	MPC · JPL
38133	1999 JY_{49}	—	May 10, 1999	Socorro	LINEAR	·	2.0 km	MPC · JPL
38134	1999 JU_{51}	—	May 10, 1999	Socorro	LINEAR	·	3.2 km	MPC · JPL
38135	1999 JB_{55}	—	May 10, 1999	Socorro	LINEAR	·	1.9 km	MPC · JPL
38136	1999 JK_{55}	—	May 10, 1999	Socorro	LINEAR	·	2.6 km	MPC · JPL
38137	1999 JH_{56}	—	May 10, 1999	Socorro	LINEAR	·	1.5 km	MPC · JPL
38138	1999 JM_{56}	—	May 10, 1999	Socorro	LINEAR	MAS	1.8 km	MPC · JPL
38139	1999 JH_{57}	—	May 10, 1999	Socorro	LINEAR	NYS	2.8 km	MPC · JPL
38140	1999 JX_{58}	—	May 10, 1999	Socorro	LINEAR	V	1.8 km	MPC · JPL
38141	1999 JN_{59}	—	May 10, 1999	Socorro	LINEAR	·	2.8 km	MPC · JPL
38142	1999 JQ_{59}	—	May 10, 1999	Socorro	LINEAR	(1338) (FLO)	2.1 km	MPC · JPL
38143	1999 JV_{60}	—	May 10, 1999	Socorro	LINEAR	·	2.2 km	MPC · JPL
38144	1999 JD_{61}	—	May 10, 1999	Socorro	LINEAR	·	5.3 km	MPC · JPL
38145	1999 JF_{61}	—	May 10, 1999	Socorro	LINEAR	·	2.1 km	MPC · JPL
38146	1999 JK_{61}	—	May 10, 1999	Socorro	LINEAR	V	2.3 km	MPC · JPL
38147	1999 JN_{62}	—	May 10, 1999	Socorro	LINEAR	·	2.0 km	MPC · JPL
38148	1999 JU_{62}	—	May 10, 1999	Socorro	LINEAR	·	1.9 km	MPC · JPL
38149	1999 JY_{62}	—	May 10, 1999	Socorro	LINEAR	·	3.1 km	MPC · JPL
38150	1999 JX_{64}	—	May 10, 1999	Socorro	LINEAR	·	2.3 km	MPC · JPL
38151	1999 JT_{65}	—	May 12, 1999	Socorro	LINEAR	·	2.0 km	MPC · JPL
38152	1999 JY_{66}	—	May 12, 1999	Socorro	LINEAR	·	2.5 km	MPC · JPL
38153	1999 JW_{67}	—	May 12, 1999	Socorro	LINEAR	·	2.1 km	MPC · JPL
38154	1999 JU_{68}	—	May 12, 1999	Socorro	LINEAR	·	2.0 km	MPC · JPL
38155	1999 JJ_{69}	—	May 12, 1999	Socorro	LINEAR	·	2.4 km	MPC · JPL
38156	1999 JQ_{71}	—	May 12, 1999	Socorro	LINEAR	·	2.7 km	MPC · JPL
38157	1999 JC_{72}	—	May 12, 1999	Socorro	LINEAR	·	2.4 km	MPC · JPL
38158	1999 JS_{72}	—	May 12, 1999	Socorro	LINEAR	NYS	2.9 km	MPC · JPL
38159	1999 JB_{73}	—	May 12, 1999	Socorro	LINEAR	·	2.1 km	MPC · JPL
38160	1999 JG_{74}	—	May 12, 1999	Socorro	LINEAR	·	2.1 km	MPC · JPL
38161	1999 JN_{74}	—	May 12, 1999	Socorro	LINEAR	·	2.1 km	MPC · JPL
38162	1999 JB_{77}	—	May 12, 1999	Socorro	LINEAR	·	3.1 km	MPC · JPL
38163	1999 JP_{77}	—	May 12, 1999	Socorro	LINEAR	·	2.7 km	MPC · JPL
38164	1999 JB_{78}	—	May 12, 1999	Socorro	LINEAR	·	2.9 km	MPC · JPL
38165	1999 JQ_{80}	—	May 12, 1999	Socorro	LINEAR	·	2.3 km	MPC · JPL
38166	1999 JV_{84}	—	May 13, 1999	Socorro	LINEAR	·	6.1 km	MPC · JPL
38167	1999 JU_{88}	—	May 12, 1999	Socorro	LINEAR	·	1.7 km	MPC · JPL
38168	1999 JZ_{91}	—	May 12, 1999	Socorro	LINEAR	·	3.4 km	MPC · JPL
38169	1999 JE_{98}	—	May 12, 1999	Socorro	LINEAR	·	3.0 km	MPC · JPL
38170	1999 JR_{98}	—	May 12, 1999	Socorro	LINEAR	·	7.8 km	MPC · JPL
38171	1999 JM_{103}	—	May 13, 1999	Socorro	LINEAR	·	1.7 km	MPC · JPL
38172	1999 JR_{107}	—	May 13, 1999	Socorro	LINEAR	·	2.1 km	MPC · JPL
38173	1999 JZ_{112}	—	May 13, 1999	Socorro	LINEAR	·	3.6 km	MPC · JPL
38174	1999 JA_{113}	—	May 13, 1999	Socorro	LINEAR	·	3.5 km	MPC · JPL
38175	1999 JQ_{118}	—	May 13, 1999	Socorro	LINEAR	NYS	2.1 km	MPC · JPL
38176	1999 JR_{119}	—	May 13, 1999	Socorro	LINEAR	·	3.8 km	MPC · JPL
38177	1999 JY_{120}	—	May 13, 1999	Socorro	LINEAR	·	3.6 km	MPC · JPL
38178	1999 JA_{122}	—	May 13, 1999	Socorro	LINEAR	·	2.9 km	MPC · JPL
38179	1999 JV_{122}	—	May 13, 1999	Socorro	LINEAR	·	3.1 km	MPC · JPL
38180	1999 JR_{123}	—	May 13, 1999	Socorro	LINEAR	(883)	2.2 km	MPC · JPL
38181	1999 JG_{124}	—	May 15, 1999	Socorro	LINEAR	·	3.7 km	MPC · JPL
38182	1999 JG_{125}	—	May 10, 1999	Socorro	LINEAR	·	1.2 km	MPC · JPL
38183	1999 JM_{125}	—	May 10, 1999	Socorro	LINEAR	NYS	3.6 km	MPC · JPL
38184	1999 KF	—	May 16, 1999	Kitt Peak	Spacewatch	·	1.9 km	MPC · JPL
38185	1999 KJ	—	May 16, 1999	Kitt Peak	Spacewatch	·	1.7 km	MPC · JPL
38186	1999 KV	—	May 17, 1999	Catalina	CSS	·	3.3 km	MPC · JPL
38187	1999 KH_{7}	—	May 17, 1999	Socorro	LINEAR	·	3.4 km	MPC · JPL
38188	1999 KX_{11}	—	May 18, 1999	Socorro	LINEAR	·	2.0 km	MPC · JPL
38189	1999 KT_{14}	—	May 18, 1999	Socorro	LINEAR	·	4.1 km	MPC · JPL
38190	1999 KU_{14}	—	May 18, 1999	Socorro	LINEAR	·	2.0 km	MPC · JPL
38191	1999 KF_{15}	—	May 18, 1999	Socorro	LINEAR	·	2.0 km	MPC · JPL
38192	1999 LP_{6}	—	June 7, 1999	Kitt Peak	Spacewatch	·	5.6 km	MPC · JPL
38193	1999 LB_{8}	—	June 8, 1999	Socorro	LINEAR	·	2.2 km	MPC · JPL
38194	1999 LS_{13}	—	June 9, 1999	Socorro	LINEAR	·	1.9 km	MPC · JPL
38195	1999 LD_{14}	—	June 9, 1999	Socorro	LINEAR	RAF	2.7 km	MPC · JPL
38196	1999 LQ_{15}	—	June 12, 1999	Socorro	LINEAR	·	3.1 km	MPC · JPL
38197	1999 LC_{19}	—	June 9, 1999	Socorro	LINEAR	slow	3.2 km	MPC · JPL
38198	1999 LM_{19}	—	June 9, 1999	Socorro	LINEAR	NYS	4.8 km	MPC · JPL
38199	1999 LO_{24}	—	June 9, 1999	Socorro	LINEAR	·	4.4 km	MPC · JPL
38200	1999 LR_{26}	—	June 9, 1999	Socorro	LINEAR	V	2.0 km	MPC · JPL

== 38201–38300 ==
back to top

Designation			Discovery			Properties		Ref
Permanent	Provisional	Named after	Date	Site	Discoverer(s)	Category	Diam.	Ref
38201	1999 LF_{27}	—	June 9, 1999	Socorro	LINEAR	EUN	3.1 km	MPC · JPL
38202	1999 LM_{33}	—	June 10, 1999	Palomar	NEAT	·	2.7 km	MPC · JPL
38203 Sanner	1999 MJ	Sanner	June 19, 1999	Junk Bond	J. Medkeff, D. Healy	·	3.8 km	MPC · JPL
38204	1999 MT	—	June 16, 1999	Višnjan Observatory	K. Korlević	·	3.0 km	MPC · JPL
38205	1999 MH_{1}	—	June 20, 1999	Anderson Mesa	LONEOS	EUN	4.1 km	MPC · JPL
38206	1999 ML_{1}	—	June 20, 1999	Anderson Mesa	LONEOS	·	5.3 km	MPC · JPL
38207	1999 MM_{1}	—	June 20, 1999	Anderson Mesa	LONEOS	MAS	3.1 km	MPC · JPL
38208	1999 MO_{1}	—	June 20, 1999	Anderson Mesa	LONEOS	EUN	4.6 km	MPC · JPL
38209	1999 NE	—	July 4, 1999	Woomera	F. B. Zoltowski	·	4.0 km	MPC · JPL
38210	1999 NP_{4}	—	July 13, 1999	Reedy Creek	J. Broughton	·	2.0 km	MPC · JPL
38211	1999 NV_{4}	—	July 12, 1999	Višnjan Observatory	K. Korlević	·	6.4 km	MPC · JPL
38212	1999 NM_{5}	—	July 13, 1999	Socorro	LINEAR	·	2.6 km	MPC · JPL
38213	1999 NU_{6}	—	July 13, 1999	Socorro	LINEAR	·	5.5 km	MPC · JPL
38214	1999 NA_{8}	—	July 13, 1999	Socorro	LINEAR	·	2.1 km	MPC · JPL
38215	1999 NX_{9}	—	July 13, 1999	Socorro	LINEAR	BRA	3.7 km	MPC · JPL
38216	1999 NP_{10}	—	July 13, 1999	Socorro	LINEAR	·	2.2 km	MPC · JPL
38217	1999 NB_{12}	—	July 13, 1999	Socorro	LINEAR	·	4.7 km	MPC · JPL
38218	1999 NY_{13}	—	July 14, 1999	Socorro	LINEAR	·	5.0 km	MPC · JPL
38219	1999 NW_{19}	—	July 14, 1999	Socorro	LINEAR	(194)	4.4 km	MPC · JPL
38220	1999 NV_{23}	—	July 14, 1999	Socorro	LINEAR	·	2.7 km	MPC · JPL
38221	1999 NB_{28}	—	July 14, 1999	Socorro	LINEAR	(5)	4.0 km	MPC · JPL
38222	1999 NP_{31}	—	July 14, 1999	Socorro	LINEAR	·	3.9 km	MPC · JPL
38223	1999 NG_{38}	—	July 14, 1999	Socorro	LINEAR	·	3.6 km	MPC · JPL
38224	1999 NC_{41}	—	July 14, 1999	Socorro	LINEAR	·	2.8 km	MPC · JPL
38225	1999 NT_{48}	—	July 13, 1999	Socorro	LINEAR	·	4.7 km	MPC · JPL
38226	1999 NG_{50}	—	July 13, 1999	Socorro	LINEAR	EUN	4.0 km	MPC · JPL
38227	1999 NJ_{50}	—	July 13, 1999	Socorro	LINEAR	EUN	3.6 km	MPC · JPL
38228	1999 NH_{52}	—	July 12, 1999	Socorro	LINEAR	EUN	2.9 km	MPC · JPL
38229	1999 NG_{53}	—	July 12, 1999	Socorro	LINEAR	EUN	4.7 km	MPC · JPL
38230	1999 NP_{53}	—	July 12, 1999	Socorro	LINEAR	·	4.2 km	MPC · JPL
38231	1999 NF_{54}	—	July 12, 1999	Socorro	LINEAR	·	11 km	MPC · JPL
38232	1999 NW_{55}	—	July 12, 1999	Socorro	LINEAR	·	4.0 km	MPC · JPL
38233	1999 NS_{57}	—	July 13, 1999	Socorro	LINEAR	·	4.3 km	MPC · JPL
38234	1999 NA_{59}	—	July 13, 1999	Socorro	LINEAR	·	7.7 km	MPC · JPL
38235	1999 NJ_{63}	—	July 14, 1999	Socorro	LINEAR	·	3.2 km	MPC · JPL
38236	1999 NC_{64}	—	July 14, 1999	Socorro	LINEAR	V	2.0 km	MPC · JPL
38237 Roche	1999 OF	Roche	July 16, 1999	Pises	Pises	NYS	1.8 km	MPC · JPL
38238 Holíč	1999 OW	Holíč	July 18, 1999	Modra	Gajdoš, S., D. Kalmančok	(5)	3.7 km	MPC · JPL
38239	1999 OR_{3}	—	July 27, 1999	Socorro	LINEAR	APO	770 m	MPC · JPL
38240	1999 PB_{1}	—	August 8, 1999	Ondřejov	L. Kotková	(5)	2.3 km	MPC · JPL
38241	1999 PU_{1}	—	August 9, 1999	Reedy Creek	J. Broughton	·	5.5 km	MPC · JPL
38242	1999 PB_{2}	—	August 10, 1999	Reedy Creek	J. Broughton	·	3.4 km	MPC · JPL
38243	1999 PB_{4}	—	August 13, 1999	Reedy Creek	J. Broughton	fast	6.5 km	MPC · JPL
38244	1999 PD_{4}	—	August 13, 1999	Reedy Creek	J. Broughton	·	6.2 km	MPC · JPL
38245 Marcospontes	1999 PF_{4}	Marcospontes	August 12, 1999	Wykrota	C. Jacques, Duczmal, L.	KOR	3.4 km	MPC · JPL
38246 Palupín	1999 PL_{4}	Palupín	August 14, 1999	Kleť	J. Tichá, M. Tichý	·	3.5 km	MPC · JPL
38247	1999 QE	—	August 18, 1999	Monte Agliale	S. Donati	·	3.1 km	MPC · JPL
38248	1999 QX	—	August 17, 1999	Kitt Peak	Spacewatch	MRX	2.5 km	MPC · JPL
38249	1999 QJ_{2}	—	August 24, 1999	Farpoint	G. Bell	·	4.8 km	MPC · JPL
38250 Tartois	1999 QS_{2}	Tartois	August 31, 1999	Blauvac	R. Roy	THM	6.2 km	MPC · JPL
38251	1999 RY	—	September 4, 1999	Catalina	CSS	·	3.4 km	MPC · JPL
38252	1999 RM_{6}	—	September 3, 1999	Kitt Peak	Spacewatch	THM	5.6 km	MPC · JPL
38253	1999 RM_{9}	—	September 4, 1999	Kitt Peak	Spacewatch	KOR	3.7 km	MPC · JPL
38254	1999 RV_{9}	—	September 6, 1999	Kitt Peak	Spacewatch	·	3.5 km	MPC · JPL
38255	1999 RH_{10}	—	September 7, 1999	Socorro	LINEAR	·	3.6 km	MPC · JPL
38256	1999 RH_{12}	—	September 7, 1999	Socorro	LINEAR	·	4.1 km	MPC · JPL
38257	1999 RC_{13}	—	September 7, 1999	Socorro	LINEAR	L5	17 km	MPC · JPL
38258	1999 RD_{14}	—	September 7, 1999	Socorro	LINEAR	·	3.9 km	MPC · JPL
38259	1999 RR_{14}	—	September 7, 1999	Socorro	LINEAR	·	12 km	MPC · JPL
38260	1999 RK_{15}	—	September 7, 1999	Socorro	LINEAR	·	5.8 km	MPC · JPL
38261	1999 RY_{16}	—	September 7, 1999	Socorro	LINEAR	·	7.8 km	MPC · JPL
38262	1999 RB_{20}	—	September 7, 1999	Socorro	LINEAR	HYG	3.8 km	MPC · JPL
38263	1999 RC_{20}	—	September 7, 1999	Socorro	LINEAR	·	10 km	MPC · JPL
38264	1999 RC_{22}	—	September 7, 1999	Socorro	LINEAR	GEF	13 km	MPC · JPL
38265	1999 RT_{22}	—	September 7, 1999	Socorro	LINEAR	VER	7.9 km	MPC · JPL
38266	1999 RH_{23}	—	September 7, 1999	Socorro	LINEAR	KOR	5.9 km	MPC · JPL
38267	1999 RB_{26}	—	September 7, 1999	Socorro	LINEAR	KOR	4.2 km	MPC · JPL
38268 Zenkert	1999 RV_{32}	Zenkert	September 9, 1999	Drebach	~Knöfel, A.	NEM	4.7 km	MPC · JPL
38269 Gueymard	1999 RN_{33}	Gueymard	September 10, 1999	Needville	Dillon, W. G., Rivich, K.	·	3.8 km	MPC · JPL
38270 Wettzell	1999 RJ_{35}	Wettzell	September 11, 1999	Starkenburg Observatory	Starkenburg	·	2.9 km	MPC · JPL
38271	1999 RW_{35}	—	September 12, 1999	Ondřejov	M. Wolf, P. Pravec	KOR	3.2 km	MPC · JPL
38272	1999 RW_{41}	—	September 13, 1999	Višnjan Observatory	K. Korlević	KOR	5.6 km	MPC · JPL
38273	1999 RN_{42}	—	September 14, 1999	Višnjan Observatory	K. Korlević	EOS	5.2 km	MPC · JPL
38274	1999 RR_{44}	—	September 14, 1999	Višnjan Observatory	K. Korlević	·	4.8 km	MPC · JPL
38275	1999 RH_{48}	—	September 7, 1999	Socorro	LINEAR	·	3.2 km	MPC · JPL
38276	1999 RH_{49}	—	September 7, 1999	Socorro	LINEAR	·	12 km	MPC · JPL
38277	1999 RP_{49}	—	September 7, 1999	Socorro	LINEAR	·	3.5 km	MPC · JPL
38278	1999 RD_{51}	—	September 7, 1999	Socorro	LINEAR	·	2.0 km	MPC · JPL
38279	1999 RU_{51}	—	September 7, 1999	Socorro	LINEAR	·	2.6 km	MPC · JPL
38280	1999 RO_{52}	—	September 7, 1999	Socorro	LINEAR	RAF	2.6 km	MPC · JPL
38281	1999 RP_{52}	—	September 7, 1999	Socorro	LINEAR	EUN	3.8 km	MPC · JPL
38282	1999 RM_{56}	—	September 7, 1999	Socorro	LINEAR	·	3.3 km	MPC · JPL
38283	1999 RK_{59}	—	September 7, 1999	Socorro	LINEAR	·	5.9 km	MPC · JPL
38284	1999 RD_{60}	—	September 7, 1999	Socorro	LINEAR	·	4.9 km	MPC · JPL
38285	1999 RS_{61}	—	September 7, 1999	Socorro	LINEAR	KOR	3.4 km	MPC · JPL
38286	1999 RP_{62}	—	September 7, 1999	Socorro	LINEAR	MAS	2.2 km	MPC · JPL
38287	1999 RQ_{64}	—	September 7, 1999	Socorro	LINEAR	PAD	7.4 km	MPC · JPL
38288	1999 RZ_{68}	—	September 7, 1999	Socorro	LINEAR	·	4.5 km	MPC · JPL
38289	1999 RM_{70}	—	September 7, 1999	Socorro	LINEAR	·	4.0 km	MPC · JPL
38290	1999 RY_{71}	—	September 7, 1999	Socorro	LINEAR	EOS	4.9 km	MPC · JPL
38291	1999 RG_{74}	—	September 7, 1999	Socorro	LINEAR	·	5.5 km	MPC · JPL
38292	1999 RA_{77}	—	September 7, 1999	Socorro	LINEAR	T_{j} (2.99) · 3:2	11 km	MPC · JPL
38293	1999 RK_{85}	—	September 7, 1999	Socorro	LINEAR	·	5.8 km	MPC · JPL
38294	1999 RM_{85}	—	September 7, 1999	Socorro	LINEAR	KOR	5.3 km	MPC · JPL
38295	1999 RA_{87}	—	September 7, 1999	Socorro	LINEAR	KOR	4.8 km	MPC · JPL
38296	1999 RD_{87}	—	September 7, 1999	Socorro	LINEAR	KOR	4.2 km	MPC · JPL
38297	1999 RE_{87}	—	September 7, 1999	Socorro	LINEAR	·	3.0 km	MPC · JPL
38298	1999 RD_{88}	—	September 7, 1999	Socorro	LINEAR	·	3.4 km	MPC · JPL
38299	1999 RK_{88}	—	September 7, 1999	Socorro	LINEAR	KOR	4.5 km	MPC · JPL
38300	1999 RF_{90}	—	September 7, 1999	Socorro	LINEAR	TEL	4.2 km	MPC · JPL

== 38301–38400 ==
back to top

Designation			Discovery			Properties		Ref
Permanent	Provisional	Named after	Date	Site	Discoverer(s)	Category	Diam.	Ref
38301	1999 RH_{92}	—	September 7, 1999	Socorro	LINEAR	KOR	5.4 km	MPC · JPL
38302	1999 RL_{92}	—	September 7, 1999	Socorro	LINEAR	KOR	3.6 km	MPC · JPL
38303	1999 RB_{93}	—	September 7, 1999	Socorro	LINEAR	·	7.5 km	MPC · JPL
38304	1999 RJ_{93}	—	September 7, 1999	Socorro	LINEAR	KOR	4.4 km	MPC · JPL
38305	1999 RM_{96}	—	September 7, 1999	Socorro	LINEAR	THM	9.8 km	MPC · JPL
38306	1999 RB_{99}	—	September 7, 1999	Socorro	LINEAR	·	9.4 km	MPC · JPL
38307	1999 RM_{102}	—	September 8, 1999	Socorro	LINEAR	·	2.7 km	MPC · JPL
38308	1999 RY_{102}	—	September 8, 1999	Socorro	LINEAR	·	5.6 km	MPC · JPL
38309	1999 RP_{103}	—	September 8, 1999	Socorro	LINEAR	·	5.8 km	MPC · JPL
38310	1999 RH_{105}	—	September 8, 1999	Socorro	LINEAR	·	4.7 km	MPC · JPL
38311	1999 RV_{106}	—	September 8, 1999	Socorro	LINEAR	·	4.1 km	MPC · JPL
38312	1999 RO_{107}	—	September 8, 1999	Socorro	LINEAR	VER · slow	9.6 km	MPC · JPL
38313	1999 RV_{111}	—	September 9, 1999	Socorro	LINEAR	·	4.6 km	MPC · JPL
38314	1999 RR_{112}	—	September 9, 1999	Socorro	LINEAR	·	2.8 km	MPC · JPL
38315	1999 RS_{112}	—	September 9, 1999	Socorro	LINEAR	LIX	8.2 km	MPC · JPL
38316	1999 RB_{113}	—	September 9, 1999	Socorro	LINEAR	·	3.3 km	MPC · JPL
38317	1999 RJ_{115}	—	September 9, 1999	Socorro	LINEAR	·	3.0 km	MPC · JPL
38318	1999 RM_{116}	—	September 9, 1999	Socorro	LINEAR	·	4.3 km	MPC · JPL
38319	1999 RG_{117}	—	September 9, 1999	Socorro	LINEAR	·	4.9 km	MPC · JPL
38320	1999 RT_{120}	—	September 9, 1999	Socorro	LINEAR	·	7.4 km	MPC · JPL
38321	1999 RQ_{121}	—	September 9, 1999	Socorro	LINEAR	·	3.7 km	MPC · JPL
38322	1999 RU_{126}	—	September 9, 1999	Socorro	LINEAR	·	5.5 km	MPC · JPL
38323	1999 RB_{127}	—	September 9, 1999	Socorro	LINEAR	·	4.7 km	MPC · JPL
38324	1999 RA_{128}	—	September 9, 1999	Socorro	LINEAR	·	3.9 km	MPC · JPL
38325	1999 RD_{128}	—	September 9, 1999	Socorro	LINEAR	(12739)	4.4 km	MPC · JPL
38326	1999 RU_{128}	—	September 9, 1999	Socorro	LINEAR	·	9.4 km	MPC · JPL
38327	1999 RX_{128}	—	September 9, 1999	Socorro	LINEAR	·	1.9 km	MPC · JPL
38328	1999 RZ_{128}	—	September 9, 1999	Socorro	LINEAR	NYS	3.4 km	MPC · JPL
38329	1999 RO_{129}	—	September 9, 1999	Socorro	LINEAR	·	5.1 km	MPC · JPL
38330	1999 RN_{130}	—	September 9, 1999	Socorro	LINEAR	NYS	3.4 km	MPC · JPL
38331	1999 RT_{130}	—	September 9, 1999	Socorro	LINEAR	·	5.8 km	MPC · JPL
38332	1999 RF_{131}	—	September 9, 1999	Socorro	LINEAR	GEF	4.4 km	MPC · JPL
38333	1999 RE_{132}	—	September 9, 1999	Socorro	LINEAR	·	4.2 km	MPC · JPL
38334	1999 RK_{133}	—	September 9, 1999	Socorro	LINEAR	·	5.5 km	MPC · JPL
38335	1999 RN_{134}	—	September 9, 1999	Socorro	LINEAR	V	2.8 km	MPC · JPL
38336	1999 RZ_{134}	—	September 9, 1999	Socorro	LINEAR	·	3.0 km	MPC · JPL
38337	1999 RP_{136}	—	September 9, 1999	Socorro	LINEAR	·	4.4 km	MPC · JPL
38338	1999 RA_{137}	—	September 9, 1999	Socorro	LINEAR	·	3.5 km	MPC · JPL
38339	1999 RH_{137}	—	September 9, 1999	Socorro	LINEAR	MAR	3.4 km	MPC · JPL
38340	1999 RO_{137}	—	September 9, 1999	Socorro	LINEAR	KOR	4.1 km	MPC · JPL
38341	1999 RB_{139}	—	September 9, 1999	Socorro	LINEAR	·	5.3 km	MPC · JPL
38342	1999 RT_{139}	—	September 9, 1999	Socorro	LINEAR	·	4.2 km	MPC · JPL
38343	1999 RG_{140}	—	September 9, 1999	Socorro	LINEAR	·	2.4 km	MPC · JPL
38344	1999 RS_{140}	—	September 9, 1999	Socorro	LINEAR	·	3.8 km	MPC · JPL
38345	1999 RO_{141}	—	September 9, 1999	Socorro	LINEAR	V	2.1 km	MPC · JPL
38346	1999 RL_{143}	—	September 9, 1999	Socorro	LINEAR	·	6.1 km	MPC · JPL
38347	1999 RS_{143}	—	September 9, 1999	Socorro	LINEAR	·	5.5 km	MPC · JPL
38348	1999 RQ_{145}	—	September 9, 1999	Socorro	LINEAR	·	6.7 km	MPC · JPL
38349	1999 RJ_{149}	—	September 9, 1999	Socorro	LINEAR	EOS	5.4 km	MPC · JPL
38350	1999 RS_{149}	—	September 9, 1999	Socorro	LINEAR	·	9.1 km	MPC · JPL
38351	1999 RQ_{150}	—	September 9, 1999	Socorro	LINEAR	·	5.0 km	MPC · JPL
38352	1999 RF_{151}	—	September 9, 1999	Socorro	LINEAR	·	3.2 km	MPC · JPL
38353	1999 RL_{151}	—	September 9, 1999	Socorro	LINEAR	·	3.8 km	MPC · JPL
38354	1999 RM_{151}	—	September 9, 1999	Socorro	LINEAR	·	3.0 km	MPC · JPL
38355	1999 RB_{152}	—	September 9, 1999	Socorro	LINEAR	·	3.3 km	MPC · JPL
38356	1999 RS_{152}	—	September 9, 1999	Socorro	LINEAR	EOS	6.6 km	MPC · JPL
38357	1999 RE_{154}	—	September 9, 1999	Socorro	LINEAR	MAR	4.8 km	MPC · JPL
38358	1999 RG_{154}	—	September 9, 1999	Socorro	LINEAR	·	4.6 km	MPC · JPL
38359	1999 RJ_{154}	—	September 9, 1999	Socorro	LINEAR	·	3.4 km	MPC · JPL
38360	1999 RM_{154}	—	September 9, 1999	Socorro	LINEAR	NYS	4.0 km	MPC · JPL
38361	1999 RY_{154}	—	September 9, 1999	Socorro	LINEAR	EOS	5.4 km	MPC · JPL
38362	1999 RW_{155}	—	September 9, 1999	Socorro	LINEAR	·	5.0 km	MPC · JPL
38363	1999 RS_{156}	—	September 9, 1999	Socorro	LINEAR	·	4.6 km	MPC · JPL
38364	1999 RT_{157}	—	September 9, 1999	Socorro	LINEAR	HYG	7.9 km	MPC · JPL
38365	1999 RE_{158}	—	September 9, 1999	Socorro	LINEAR	THM ·	7.8 km	MPC · JPL
38366	1999 RF_{158}	—	September 9, 1999	Socorro	LINEAR	KOR	3.7 km	MPC · JPL
38367	1999 RZ_{162}	—	September 9, 1999	Socorro	LINEAR	·	8.8 km	MPC · JPL
38368	1999 RQ_{164}	—	September 9, 1999	Socorro	LINEAR	MAR	5.4 km	MPC · JPL
38369	1999 RX_{164}	—	September 9, 1999	Socorro	LINEAR	·	8.0 km	MPC · JPL
38370	1999 RB_{165}	—	September 9, 1999	Socorro	LINEAR	·	3.2 km	MPC · JPL
38371	1999 RO_{167}	—	September 9, 1999	Socorro	LINEAR	EOS	6.7 km	MPC · JPL
38372	1999 RK_{168}	—	September 9, 1999	Socorro	LINEAR	·	5.4 km	MPC · JPL
38373	1999 RG_{172}	—	September 9, 1999	Socorro	LINEAR	·	5.0 km	MPC · JPL
38374	1999 RY_{172}	—	September 9, 1999	Socorro	LINEAR	HNS	4.7 km	MPC · JPL
38375	1999 RC_{173}	—	September 9, 1999	Socorro	LINEAR	·	2.4 km	MPC · JPL
38376	1999 RH_{174}	—	September 9, 1999	Socorro	LINEAR	·	2.4 km	MPC · JPL
38377	1999 RM_{174}	—	September 9, 1999	Socorro	LINEAR	·	4.5 km	MPC · JPL
38378	1999 RK_{175}	—	September 9, 1999	Socorro	LINEAR	·	6.2 km	MPC · JPL
38379	1999 RQ_{175}	—	September 9, 1999	Socorro	LINEAR	·	2.6 km	MPC · JPL
38380	1999 RR_{175}	—	September 9, 1999	Socorro	LINEAR	MAR	3.7 km	MPC · JPL
38381	1999 RV_{175}	—	September 9, 1999	Socorro	LINEAR	fast	3.2 km	MPC · JPL
38382	1999 RZ_{175}	—	September 9, 1999	Socorro	LINEAR	·	5.1 km	MPC · JPL
38383	1999 RF_{176}	—	September 9, 1999	Socorro	LINEAR	·	6.2 km	MPC · JPL
38384	1999 RX_{180}	—	September 9, 1999	Socorro	LINEAR	KOR	4.0 km	MPC · JPL
38385	1999 RT_{181}	—	September 9, 1999	Socorro	LINEAR	AGN	3.9 km	MPC · JPL
38386	1999 RH_{182}	—	September 9, 1999	Socorro	LINEAR	·	4.9 km	MPC · JPL
38387	1999 RB_{184}	—	September 9, 1999	Socorro	LINEAR	KOR	4.4 km	MPC · JPL
38388	1999 RG_{186}	—	September 9, 1999	Socorro	LINEAR	·	3.0 km	MPC · JPL
38389	1999 RJ_{187}	—	September 9, 1999	Socorro	LINEAR	·	5.1 km	MPC · JPL
38390	1999 RO_{187}	—	September 9, 1999	Socorro	LINEAR	·	3.9 km	MPC · JPL
38391	1999 RD_{188}	—	September 9, 1999	Socorro	LINEAR	KOR	3.1 km	MPC · JPL
38392	1999 RQ_{189}	—	September 9, 1999	Socorro	LINEAR	·	7.5 km	MPC · JPL
38393	1999 RD_{191}	—	September 11, 1999	Socorro	LINEAR	·	4.3 km	MPC · JPL
38394	1999 RY_{192}	—	September 13, 1999	Socorro	LINEAR	THM	7.7 km	MPC · JPL
38395	1999 RR_{193}	—	September 15, 1999	Kitt Peak	Spacewatch	SYL · CYB	12 km	MPC · JPL
38396	1999 RU_{193}	—	September 7, 1999	Socorro	LINEAR	·	8.7 km	MPC · JPL
38397	1999 RY_{193}	—	September 7, 1999	Socorro	LINEAR	(1298)	6.6 km	MPC · JPL
38398	1999 RC_{195}	—	September 8, 1999	Socorro	LINEAR	slow	9.7 km	MPC · JPL
38399	1999 RO_{196}	—	September 8, 1999	Socorro	LINEAR	EUN	4.8 km	MPC · JPL
38400	1999 RX_{196}	—	September 8, 1999	Socorro	LINEAR	·	7.5 km	MPC · JPL

== 38401–38500 ==
back to top

Designation			Discovery			Properties		Ref
Permanent	Provisional	Named after	Date	Site	Discoverer(s)	Category	Diam.	Ref
38401	1999 RJ_{197}	—	September 8, 1999	Socorro	LINEAR	·	5.4 km	MPC · JPL
38402	1999 RP_{197}	—	September 8, 1999	Socorro	LINEAR	·	5.1 km	MPC · JPL
38403	1999 RU_{197}	—	September 8, 1999	Socorro	LINEAR	MAR	5.2 km	MPC · JPL
38404	1999 RF_{202}	—	September 8, 1999	Socorro	LINEAR	EOS	6.4 km	MPC · JPL
38405	1999 RS_{202}	—	September 8, 1999	Socorro	LINEAR	EOS	5.3 km	MPC · JPL
38406	1999 RS_{203}	—	September 8, 1999	Socorro	LINEAR	·	9.7 km	MPC · JPL
38407	1999 RF_{204}	—	September 8, 1999	Socorro	LINEAR	GEF	6.0 km	MPC · JPL
38408	1999 RN_{204}	—	September 8, 1999	Socorro	LINEAR	·	3.4 km	MPC · JPL
38409	1999 RK_{205}	—	September 8, 1999	Socorro	LINEAR	·	9.7 km	MPC · JPL
38410	1999 RT_{208}	—	September 8, 1999	Socorro	LINEAR	EOS	5.1 km	MPC · JPL
38411	1999 RQ_{210}	—	September 8, 1999	Socorro	LINEAR	·	5.5 km	MPC · JPL
38412	1999 RX_{210}	—	September 8, 1999	Socorro	LINEAR	·	7.4 km	MPC · JPL
38413	1999 RY_{211}	—	September 8, 1999	Socorro	LINEAR	·	4.2 km	MPC · JPL
38414	1999 RT_{213}	—	September 13, 1999	Kitt Peak	Spacewatch	·	3.5 km	MPC · JPL
38415	1999 RU_{213}	—	September 13, 1999	Kitt Peak	Spacewatch	·	3.8 km	MPC · JPL
38416	1999 RV_{213}	—	September 13, 1999	Kitt Peak	Spacewatch	KOR	3.2 km	MPC · JPL
38417	1999 RN_{218}	—	September 4, 1999	Catalina	CSS	·	4.5 km	MPC · JPL
38418	1999 RW_{218}	—	September 5, 1999	Kitt Peak	Spacewatch	·	2.6 km	MPC · JPL
38419	1999 RX_{219}	—	September 4, 1999	Catalina	CSS	VER	7.6 km	MPC · JPL
38420	1999 RV_{221}	—	September 5, 1999	Catalina	CSS	EOS	5.5 km	MPC · JPL
38421	1999 RZ_{221}	—	September 6, 1999	Catalina	CSS	·	6.5 km	MPC · JPL
38422	1999 RJ_{226}	—	September 4, 1999	Anderson Mesa	LONEOS	·	6.3 km	MPC · JPL
38423 Jeokjungchogye	1999 RS_{226}	Jeokjungchogye	September 5, 1999	Catalina	CSS	(10654)	8.7 km	MPC · JPL
38424	1999 RU_{228}	—	September 5, 1999	Catalina	CSS	·	8.7 km	MPC · JPL
38425	1999 RO_{230}	—	September 8, 1999	Catalina	CSS	EOS	7.8 km	MPC · JPL
38426	1999 RT_{230}	—	September 8, 1999	Catalina	CSS	·	6.3 km	MPC · JPL
38427	1999 RB_{231}	—	September 8, 1999	Catalina	CSS	·	6.5 km	MPC · JPL
38428	1999 RQ_{231}	—	September 9, 1999	Anderson Mesa	LONEOS	DOR	7.2 km	MPC · JPL
38429	1999 RX_{231}	—	September 9, 1999	Anderson Mesa	LONEOS	EOS	6.6 km	MPC · JPL
38430	1999 RG_{232}	—	September 9, 1999	Anderson Mesa	LONEOS	·	9.4 km	MPC · JPL
38431 Jeffbeck	1999 RR_{232}	Jeffbeck	September 8, 1999	Catalina	CSS	·	5.7 km	MPC · JPL
38432	1999 RU_{235}	—	September 8, 1999	Catalina	CSS	EOS	5.1 km	MPC · JPL
38433	1999 RL_{236}	—	September 8, 1999	Catalina	CSS	·	5.2 km	MPC · JPL
38434	1999 RX_{236}	—	September 8, 1999	Catalina	CSS	·	11 km	MPC · JPL
38435	1999 RA_{241}	—	September 11, 1999	Anderson Mesa	LONEOS	·	7.7 km	MPC · JPL
38436	1999 RS_{241}	—	September 14, 1999	Catalina	CSS	MIS	5.7 km	MPC · JPL
38437	1999 RV_{242}	—	September 4, 1999	Anderson Mesa	LONEOS	·	2.9 km	MPC · JPL
38438	1999 RC_{249}	—	September 7, 1999	Socorro	LINEAR	·	4.7 km	MPC · JPL
38439	1999 SQ_{4}	—	September 29, 1999	Višnjan Observatory	K. Korlević	·	6.5 km	MPC · JPL
38440	1999 SA_{5}	—	September 29, 1999	Socorro	LINEAR	·	4.3 km	MPC · JPL
38441	1999 SN_{6}	—	September 30, 1999	Socorro	LINEAR	EOS	7.8 km	MPC · JPL
38442 Szilárd	1999 SU_{6}	Szilárd	September 24, 1999	Piszkéstető	K. Sárneczky, Szabo, G.	KOR	4.6 km	MPC · JPL
38443	1999 SM_{7}	—	September 29, 1999	Socorro	LINEAR	EOS	8.3 km	MPC · JPL
38444	1999 SY_{9}	—	September 29, 1999	Woomera	F. B. Zoltowski	·	5.0 km	MPC · JPL
38445	1999 SB_{12}	—	September 30, 1999	Catalina	CSS	KOR	3.4 km	MPC · JPL
38446	1999 SK_{17}	—	September 30, 1999	Socorro	LINEAR	·	4.0 km	MPC · JPL
38447	1999 SO_{18}	—	September 30, 1999	Socorro	LINEAR	VER	8.4 km	MPC · JPL
38448	1999 SS_{18}	—	September 30, 1999	Socorro	LINEAR	MAR	4.0 km	MPC · JPL
38449	1999 SM_{22}	—	September 30, 1999	Kitt Peak	Spacewatch	·	2.2 km	MPC · JPL
38450	1999 TH	—	October 2, 1999	Prescott	P. G. Comba	·	9.2 km	MPC · JPL
38451	1999 TU	—	October 1, 1999	Višnjan Observatory	K. Korlević	·	2.6 km	MPC · JPL
38452	1999 TE_{1}	—	October 1, 1999	Višnjan Observatory	K. Korlević	THM	8.4 km	MPC · JPL
38453	1999 TU_{1}	—	October 1, 1999	Višnjan Observatory	K. Korlević	·	19 km	MPC · JPL
38454 Boroson	1999 TB_{2}	Boroson	October 2, 1999	Fountain Hills	C. W. Juels	EUN · slow	6.3 km	MPC · JPL
38455	1999 TK_{3}	—	October 4, 1999	Prescott	P. G. Comba	·	6.8 km	MPC · JPL
38456	1999 TO_{6}	—	October 6, 1999	Višnjan Observatory	K. Korlević, M. Jurić	THM	9.2 km	MPC · JPL
38457	1999 TJ_{9}	—	October 7, 1999	Višnjan Observatory	K. Korlević, M. Jurić	·	14 km	MPC · JPL
38458	1999 TP_{12}	—	October 12, 1999	Prescott	P. G. Comba	EUN	5.4 km	MPC · JPL
38459	1999 TX_{12}	—	October 10, 1999	Fountain Hills	C. W. Juels	·	8.4 km	MPC · JPL
38460	1999 TH_{13}	—	October 7, 1999	Višnjan Observatory	K. Korlević, M. Jurić	·	6.8 km	MPC · JPL
38461 Jiřítrnka	1999 TR_{17}	Jiřítrnka	October 15, 1999	Ondřejov	P. Pravec	·	6.5 km	MPC · JPL
38462	1999 TL_{21}	—	October 12, 1999	Bergisch Gladbach	W. Bickel	THM	8.9 km	MPC · JPL
38463	1999 TM_{22}	—	October 3, 1999	Kitt Peak	Spacewatch	·	5.2 km	MPC · JPL
38464	1999 TZ_{24}	—	October 2, 1999	Socorro	LINEAR	KOR	3.3 km	MPC · JPL
38465	1999 TL_{28}	—	October 4, 1999	Socorro	LINEAR	GEF	5.1 km	MPC · JPL
38466	1999 TU_{29}	—	October 4, 1999	Socorro	LINEAR	KOR	4.1 km	MPC · JPL
38467	1999 TW_{33}	—	October 4, 1999	Socorro	LINEAR	MRX	2.6 km	MPC · JPL
38468	1999 TD_{34}	—	October 5, 1999	Socorro	LINEAR	EUN	5.4 km	MPC · JPL
38469	1999 TN_{34}	—	October 2, 1999	Socorro	LINEAR	·	7.6 km	MPC · JPL
38470 Deleflie	1999 TL_{36}	Deleflie	October 12, 1999	Anderson Mesa	LONEOS	HIL · 3:2	12 km	MPC · JPL
38471	1999 TH_{39}	—	October 3, 1999	Catalina	CSS	EOS	5.7 km	MPC · JPL
38472	1999 TJ_{51}	—	October 4, 1999	Kitt Peak	Spacewatch	EOS	6.5 km	MPC · JPL
38473	1999 TA_{85}	—	October 14, 1999	Kitt Peak	Spacewatch	·	2.3 km	MPC · JPL
38474	1999 TS_{88}	—	October 2, 1999	Socorro	LINEAR	·	5.0 km	MPC · JPL
38475	1999 TT_{89}	—	October 2, 1999	Socorro	LINEAR	·	9.0 km	MPC · JPL
38476	1999 TA_{91}	—	October 2, 1999	Socorro	LINEAR	·	7.1 km	MPC · JPL
38477	1999 TR_{92}	—	October 2, 1999	Socorro	LINEAR	EOS	5.2 km	MPC · JPL
38478	1999 TX_{94}	—	October 2, 1999	Socorro	LINEAR	·	6.3 km	MPC · JPL
38479	1999 TK_{95}	—	October 2, 1999	Socorro	LINEAR	EOS	6.3 km	MPC · JPL
38480	1999 TL_{99}	—	October 2, 1999	Socorro	LINEAR	EOS	6.1 km	MPC · JPL
38481	1999 TX_{99}	—	October 2, 1999	Socorro	LINEAR	·	4.3 km	MPC · JPL
38482	1999 TC_{100}	—	October 2, 1999	Socorro	LINEAR	EOS	7.2 km	MPC · JPL
38483	1999 TW_{100}	—	October 2, 1999	Socorro	LINEAR	·	5.0 km	MPC · JPL
38484	1999 TX_{100}	—	October 2, 1999	Socorro	LINEAR	·	3.2 km	MPC · JPL
38485	1999 TQ_{102}	—	October 2, 1999	Socorro	LINEAR	·	6.9 km	MPC · JPL
38486	1999 TE_{108}	—	October 4, 1999	Socorro	LINEAR	·	5.3 km	MPC · JPL
38487	1999 TL_{108}	—	October 4, 1999	Socorro	LINEAR	EOS	6.1 km	MPC · JPL
38488	1999 TP_{113}	—	October 4, 1999	Socorro	LINEAR	EOS	6.0 km	MPC · JPL
38489	1999 TB_{116}	—	October 4, 1999	Socorro	LINEAR	VER · slow	7.4 km	MPC · JPL
38490	1999 TA_{117}	—	October 4, 1999	Socorro	LINEAR	KOR	5.8 km	MPC · JPL
38491	1999 TO_{117}	—	October 4, 1999	Socorro	LINEAR	·	9.2 km	MPC · JPL
38492	1999 TQ_{117}	—	October 4, 1999	Socorro	LINEAR	·	8.6 km	MPC · JPL
38493	1999 TT_{117}	—	October 4, 1999	Socorro	LINEAR	·	10 km	MPC · JPL
38494	1999 TG_{119}	—	October 4, 1999	Socorro	LINEAR	·	7.3 km	MPC · JPL
38495	1999 TP_{119}	—	October 4, 1999	Socorro	LINEAR	·	5.5 km	MPC · JPL
38496	1999 TT_{120}	—	October 4, 1999	Socorro	LINEAR	·	8.9 km	MPC · JPL
38497	1999 TK_{130}	—	October 6, 1999	Socorro	LINEAR	·	7.8 km	MPC · JPL
38498	1999 TX_{148}	—	October 7, 1999	Socorro	LINEAR	·	5.3 km	MPC · JPL
38499	1999 TT_{161}	—	October 9, 1999	Socorro	LINEAR	·	6.0 km	MPC · JPL
38500	1999 TN_{165}	—	October 10, 1999	Socorro	LINEAR	EOS	4.1 km	MPC · JPL

== 38501–38600 ==
back to top

Designation			Discovery			Properties		Ref
Permanent	Provisional	Named after	Date	Site	Discoverer(s)	Category	Diam.	Ref
38501	1999 TN_{170}	—	October 10, 1999	Socorro	LINEAR	THM	6.4 km	MPC · JPL
38502	1999 TC_{171}	—	October 10, 1999	Socorro	LINEAR	THM · fast	7.1 km	MPC · JPL
38503	1999 TF_{186}	—	October 12, 1999	Socorro	LINEAR	·	6.5 km	MPC · JPL
38504	1999 TO_{186}	—	October 12, 1999	Socorro	LINEAR	·	5.9 km	MPC · JPL
38505	1999 TU_{190}	—	October 12, 1999	Socorro	LINEAR	·	6.3 km	MPC · JPL
38506	1999 TB_{192}	—	October 12, 1999	Socorro	LINEAR	·	9.7 km	MPC · JPL
38507	1999 TD_{192}	—	October 12, 1999	Socorro	LINEAR	·	14 km	MPC · JPL
38508	1999 TR_{213}	—	October 15, 1999	Socorro	LINEAR	·	8.3 km	MPC · JPL
38509	1999 TQ_{220}	—	October 1, 1999	Catalina	CSS	·	10 km	MPC · JPL
38510	1999 TF_{221}	—	October 2, 1999	Catalina	CSS	·	6.4 km	MPC · JPL
38511	1999 TU_{230}	—	October 5, 1999	Anderson Mesa	LONEOS	EMA	8.4 km	MPC · JPL
38512	1999 TU_{233}	—	October 3, 1999	Socorro	LINEAR	·	11 km	MPC · JPL
38513	1999 TJ_{236}	—	October 3, 1999	Catalina	CSS	·	6.5 km	MPC · JPL
38514	1999 TF_{238}	—	October 4, 1999	Catalina	CSS	EOS	6.6 km	MPC · JPL
38515	1999 TP_{245}	—	October 7, 1999	Catalina	CSS	EOS	7.0 km	MPC · JPL
38516	1999 TQ_{248}	—	October 8, 1999	Catalina	CSS	·	17 km	MPC · JPL
38517	1999 TL_{249}	—	October 9, 1999	Catalina	CSS	DOR	6.6 km	MPC · JPL
38518	1999 TN_{252}	—	October 8, 1999	Socorro	LINEAR	·	4.2 km	MPC · JPL
38519	1999 TB_{253}	—	October 9, 1999	Socorro	LINEAR	EOS	5.6 km	MPC · JPL
38520	1999 TZ_{255}	—	October 9, 1999	Kitt Peak	Spacewatch	·	4.6 km	MPC · JPL
38521	1999 TG_{262}	—	October 14, 1999	Socorro	LINEAR	slow	11 km	MPC · JPL
38522	1999 TA_{271}	—	October 3, 1999	Socorro	LINEAR	·	12 km	MPC · JPL
38523	1999 TY_{279}	—	October 7, 1999	Socorro	LINEAR	EOS	7.8 km	MPC · JPL
38524	1999 TS_{287}	—	October 10, 1999	Socorro	LINEAR	·	5.1 km	MPC · JPL
38525	1999 TY_{288}	—	October 10, 1999	Socorro	LINEAR	(1298)	8.9 km	MPC · JPL
38526	1999 TB_{296}	—	October 1, 1999	Catalina	CSS	THM	8.7 km	MPC · JPL
38527	1999 TJ_{315}	—	October 9, 1999	Socorro	LINEAR	THM	7.1 km	MPC · JPL
38528	1999 UL_{4}	—	October 31, 1999	Fountain Hills	C. W. Juels	EOS	6.7 km	MPC · JPL
38529	1999 UR_{6}	—	October 29, 1999	Xinglong	SCAP	·	7.4 km	MPC · JPL
38530	1999 UY_{14}	—	October 29, 1999	Catalina	CSS	KOR	4.4 km	MPC · JPL
38531	1999 UF_{15}	—	October 29, 1999	Catalina	CSS	·	8.4 km	MPC · JPL
38532	1999 UQ_{24}	—	October 28, 1999	Catalina	CSS	·	8.5 km	MPC · JPL
38533	1999 UQ_{33}	—	October 31, 1999	Kitt Peak	Spacewatch	THM	6.7 km	MPC · JPL
38534	1999 UQ_{39}	—	October 31, 1999	Kitt Peak	Spacewatch	·	4.8 km	MPC · JPL
38535	1999 UO_{42}	—	October 28, 1999	Catalina	CSS	EOS · fast	8.6 km	MPC · JPL
38536	1999 UT_{42}	—	October 28, 1999	Catalina	CSS	·	9.1 km	MPC · JPL
38537	1999 UJ_{43}	—	October 28, 1999	Catalina	CSS	·	9.5 km	MPC · JPL
38538	1999 UZ_{47}	—	October 30, 1999	Catalina	CSS	EOS	5.6 km	MPC · JPL
38539	1999 UH_{52}	—	October 31, 1999	Catalina	CSS	·	6.4 km	MPC · JPL
38540 Stevens	1999 VG_{2}	Stevens	November 5, 1999	Jornada	Dixon, D. S.	EOS	7.5 km	MPC · JPL
38541 Rustichelli	1999 VT_{6}	Rustichelli	November 7, 1999	Cavezzo	Cavezzo	HYG	7.6 km	MPC · JPL
38542	1999 VD_{7}	—	November 7, 1999	Višnjan Observatory	K. Korlević	·	9.4 km	MPC · JPL
38543	1999 VW_{9}	—	November 9, 1999	Fountain Hills	C. W. Juels	·	6.5 km	MPC · JPL
38544	1999 VS_{21}	—	November 12, 1999	Višnjan Observatory	K. Korlević	·	10 km	MPC · JPL
38545	1999 VS_{27}	—	November 3, 1999	Catalina	CSS	·	11 km	MPC · JPL
38546	1999 VV_{32}	—	November 3, 1999	Socorro	LINEAR	·	7.8 km	MPC · JPL
38547	1999 VN_{35}	—	November 3, 1999	Socorro	LINEAR	·	6.9 km	MPC · JPL
38548	1999 VK_{47}	—	November 3, 1999	Socorro	LINEAR	·	22 km	MPC · JPL
38549	1999 VG_{48}	—	November 3, 1999	Socorro	LINEAR	·	3.7 km	MPC · JPL
38550	1999 VS_{53}	—	November 4, 1999	Socorro	LINEAR	fast	12 km	MPC · JPL
38551	1999 VD_{54}	—	November 4, 1999	Socorro	LINEAR	THM	6.3 km	MPC · JPL
38552	1999 VD_{66}	—	November 4, 1999	Socorro	LINEAR	·	7.7 km	MPC · JPL
38553	1999 VU_{68}	—	November 4, 1999	Socorro	LINEAR	3:2	9.7 km	MPC · JPL
38554	1999 VR_{78}	—	November 4, 1999	Socorro	LINEAR	·	12 km	MPC · JPL
38555	1999 VG_{83}	—	November 1, 1999	Kitt Peak	Spacewatch	·	4.6 km	MPC · JPL
38556	1999 VP_{87}	—	November 5, 1999	Socorro	LINEAR	·	14 km	MPC · JPL
38557	1999 VV_{92}	—	November 9, 1999	Socorro	LINEAR	·	4.9 km	MPC · JPL
38558	1999 VM_{114}	—	November 9, 1999	Catalina	CSS	·	11 km	MPC · JPL
38559	1999 VC_{115}	—	November 9, 1999	Catalina	CSS	URS	11 km	MPC · JPL
38560	1999 VC_{123}	—	November 5, 1999	Kitt Peak	Spacewatch	THM	7.1 km	MPC · JPL
38561	1999 VA_{133}	—	November 10, 1999	Kitt Peak	Spacewatch	(5)	2.7 km	MPC · JPL
38562	1999 VG_{139}	—	November 10, 1999	Kitt Peak	Spacewatch	(1298) · slow	8.6 km	MPC · JPL
38563	1999 VW_{140}	—	November 10, 1999	Kitt Peak	Spacewatch	THM	5.8 km	MPC · JPL
38564	1999 VB_{144}	—	November 11, 1999	Catalina	CSS	·	6.8 km	MPC · JPL
38565	1999 VY_{145}	—	November 12, 1999	Socorro	LINEAR	·	3.5 km	MPC · JPL
38566	1999 VQ_{147}	—	November 14, 1999	Socorro	LINEAR	·	4.6 km	MPC · JPL
38567	1999 VZ_{161}	—	November 14, 1999	Socorro	LINEAR	HYG	11 km	MPC · JPL
38568	1999 VE_{184}	—	November 15, 1999	Socorro	LINEAR	·	6.6 km	MPC · JPL
38569	1999 VO_{198}	—	November 3, 1999	Catalina	CSS	VER	8.0 km	MPC · JPL
38570	1999 VH_{199}	—	November 2, 1999	Catalina	CSS	·	7.5 km	MPC · JPL
38571	1999 VH_{211}	—	November 14, 1999	Catalina	CSS	HYG	5.6 km	MPC · JPL
38572	1999 VU_{223}	—	November 5, 1999	Socorro	LINEAR	EOS	7.7 km	MPC · JPL
38573	1999 WA_{1}	—	November 19, 1999	High Point	D. K. Chesney	·	14 km	MPC · JPL
38574	1999 WS_{4}	—	November 28, 1999	Oizumi	T. Kobayashi	L4	17 km	MPC · JPL
38575	1999 XH_{2}	—	December 2, 1999	Kitt Peak	Spacewatch	·	5.5 km	MPC · JPL
38576	1999 XL_{3}	—	December 4, 1999	Catalina	CSS	·	6.2 km	MPC · JPL
38577	1999 XZ_{10}	—	December 5, 1999	Catalina	CSS	·	19 km	MPC · JPL
38578	1999 XS_{11}	—	December 6, 1999	Catalina	CSS	CYB	11 km	MPC · JPL
38579	1999 XM_{15}	—	December 5, 1999	Višnjan Observatory	K. Korlević	3:2	12 km	MPC · JPL
38580	1999 XN_{17}	—	December 2, 1999	Socorro	LINEAR	PHO	6.6 km	MPC · JPL
38581	1999 XQ_{17}	—	December 2, 1999	Socorro	LINEAR	·	5.3 km	MPC · JPL
38582	1999 XE_{37}	—	December 7, 1999	Fountain Hills	C. W. Juels	EOS ·	10 km	MPC · JPL
38583	1999 XX_{42}	—	December 7, 1999	Socorro	LINEAR	HYG	7.7 km	MPC · JPL
38584	1999 XH_{47}	—	December 7, 1999	Socorro	LINEAR	·	8.3 km	MPC · JPL
38585	1999 XD_{67}	—	December 7, 1999	Socorro	LINEAR	L4	13 km	MPC · JPL
38586	1999 XW_{70}	—	December 7, 1999	Socorro	LINEAR	·	5.6 km	MPC · JPL
38587	1999 XO_{80}	—	December 7, 1999	Socorro	LINEAR	·	10 km	MPC · JPL
38588	1999 XV_{91}	—	December 7, 1999	Socorro	LINEAR	V	2.0 km	MPC · JPL
38589	1999 XV_{113}	—	December 11, 1999	Socorro	LINEAR	·	12 km	MPC · JPL
38590	1999 XT_{115}	—	December 5, 1999	Catalina	CSS	·	7.2 km	MPC · JPL
38591	1999 XZ_{116}	—	December 5, 1999	Catalina	CSS	LIX	13 km	MPC · JPL
38592	1999 XH_{162}	—	December 13, 1999	Socorro	LINEAR	L4	20 km	MPC · JPL
38593	1999 XF_{166}	—	December 10, 1999	Socorro	LINEAR	THB	8.2 km	MPC · JPL
38594	1999 XF_{193}	—	December 12, 1999	Socorro	LINEAR	L4	20 km	MPC · JPL
38595	1999 XD_{196}	—	December 12, 1999	Socorro	LINEAR	·	9.7 km	MPC · JPL
38596	1999 XP_{199}	—	December 12, 1999	Socorro	LINEAR	L4	13 km	MPC · JPL
38597	1999 XU_{200}	—	December 12, 1999	Socorro	LINEAR	L4	20 km	MPC · JPL
38598	1999 XQ_{208}	—	December 13, 1999	Socorro	LINEAR	L4	13 km	MPC · JPL
38599	1999 XC_{210}	—	December 13, 1999	Socorro	LINEAR	L4	20 km	MPC · JPL
38600	1999 XR_{213}	—	December 14, 1999	Socorro	LINEAR	L4	23 km	MPC · JPL

== 38601–38700 ==
back to top

Designation			Discovery			Properties		Ref
Permanent	Provisional	Named after	Date	Site	Discoverer(s)	Category	Diam.	Ref
38601	1999 XK_{229}	—	December 7, 1999	Catalina	CSS	SYL · CYB	9.8 km	MPC · JPL
38602	1999 XW_{229}	—	December 7, 1999	Catalina	CSS	·	13 km	MPC · JPL
38603	1999 XO_{242}	—	December 13, 1999	Catalina	CSS	·	4.2 km	MPC · JPL
38604	1999 YJ_{4}	—	December 27, 1999	Farpoint	G. Hug, G. Bell	EOS	6.3 km	MPC · JPL
38605	1999 YV_{10}	—	December 27, 1999	Kitt Peak	Spacewatch	HYG	9.9 km	MPC · JPL
38606	1999 YC_{13}	—	December 31, 1999	Višnjan Observatory	K. Korlević	L4	24 km	MPC · JPL
38607	2000 AN_{6}	—	January 4, 2000	Prescott	P. G. Comba	L4	23 km	MPC · JPL
38608	2000 AW_{11}	—	January 3, 2000	Socorro	LINEAR	KOR	3.8 km	MPC · JPL
38609	2000 AB_{26}	—	January 3, 2000	Socorro	LINEAR	L4	20 km	MPC · JPL
38610	2000 AU_{45}	—	January 3, 2000	Socorro	LINEAR	L4	29 km	MPC · JPL
38611	2000 AS_{74}	—	January 5, 2000	Socorro	LINEAR	L4	20 km	MPC · JPL
38612	2000 AA_{79}	—	January 5, 2000	Socorro	LINEAR	·	4.5 km	MPC · JPL
38613	2000 AV_{110}	—	January 5, 2000	Socorro	LINEAR	T_{j} (2.98) · 3:2	24 km	MPC · JPL
38614	2000 AA_{113}	—	January 5, 2000	Socorro	LINEAR	L4	17 km	MPC · JPL
38615	2000 AV_{121}	—	January 5, 2000	Socorro	LINEAR	L4	21 km	MPC · JPL
38616	2000 AS_{145}	—	January 7, 2000	Socorro	LINEAR	·	9.7 km	MPC · JPL
38617	2000 AY_{161}	—	January 4, 2000	Socorro	LINEAR	L4	16 km	MPC · JPL
38618	2000 AH_{165}	—	January 8, 2000	Socorro	LINEAR	PHO	3.3 km	MPC · JPL
38619	2000 AW_{183}	—	January 7, 2000	Socorro	LINEAR	L4	21 km	MPC · JPL
38620	2000 AQ_{186}	—	January 8, 2000	Socorro	LINEAR	·	5.4 km	MPC · JPL
38621	2000 AG_{201}	—	January 9, 2000	Socorro	LINEAR	L4	20 km	MPC · JPL
38622	2000 AZ_{230}	—	January 4, 2000	Anderson Mesa	LONEOS	URS	9.5 km	MPC · JPL
38623	2000 AQ_{233}	—	January 5, 2000	Socorro	LINEAR	·	10 km	MPC · JPL
38624	2000 CD_{12}	—	February 2, 2000	Socorro	LINEAR	·	2.5 km	MPC · JPL
38625	2000 CN_{12}	—	February 2, 2000	Socorro	LINEAR	·	6.4 km	MPC · JPL
38626	2000 EZ_{97}	—	March 12, 2000	Socorro	LINEAR	H	1.5 km	MPC · JPL
38627	2000 EV_{119}	—	March 11, 2000	Anderson Mesa	LONEOS	·	2.7 km	MPC · JPL
38628 Huya	2000 EB_{173}	Huya	March 10, 2000	Mérida	Ferrin, I. R.	plutino · moon	411 km	MPC · JPL
38629	2000 ER_{173}	—	March 4, 2000	Socorro	LINEAR	·	4.3 km	MPC · JPL
38630	2000 GA_{93}	—	April 5, 2000	Socorro	LINEAR	·	1.9 km	MPC · JPL
38631	2000 KA_{31}	—	May 28, 2000	Socorro	LINEAR	·	8.6 km	MPC · JPL
38632	2000 KX_{36}	—	May 29, 2000	Socorro	LINEAR	H	1.8 km	MPC · JPL
38633	2000 LY_{13}	—	June 6, 2000	Socorro	LINEAR	PHO	4.2 km	MPC · JPL
38634	2000 LL_{18}	—	June 8, 2000	Socorro	LINEAR	EUN	4.4 km	MPC · JPL
38635	2000 LB_{21}	—	June 8, 2000	Socorro	LINEAR	fast	2.0 km	MPC · JPL
38636 Kitazato	2000 LM_{27}	Kitazato	June 6, 2000	Anderson Mesa	LONEOS	·	1.3 km	MPC · JPL
38637	2000 LL_{35}	—	June 1, 2000	Kitt Peak	Spacewatch	·	3.5 km	MPC · JPL
38638	2000 NZ_{8}	—	July 7, 2000	Socorro	LINEAR	·	1.6 km	MPC · JPL
38639 Samuels	2000 NJ_{16}	Samuels	July 5, 2000	Anderson Mesa	LONEOS	·	1.3 km	MPC · JPL
38640 Rau	2000 NO_{16}	Rau	July 5, 2000	Anderson Mesa	LONEOS	·	1.6 km	MPC · JPL
38641 Philpott	2000 NX_{16}	Philpott	July 5, 2000	Anderson Mesa	LONEOS	NYS	2.7 km	MPC · JPL
38642 Breukers	2000 NY_{17}	Breukers	July 5, 2000	Anderson Mesa	LONEOS	·	2.1 km	MPC · JPL
38643 Scholten	2000 NZ_{19}	Scholten	July 5, 2000	Anderson Mesa	LONEOS	·	1.8 km	MPC · JPL
38644	2000 NN_{21}	—	July 7, 2000	Socorro	LINEAR	·	3.9 km	MPC · JPL
38645	2000 OT_{3}	—	July 24, 2000	Socorro	LINEAR	·	2.9 km	MPC · JPL
38646	2000 OX_{4}	—	July 24, 2000	Socorro	LINEAR	EUN	3.9 km	MPC · JPL
38647	2000 OW_{8}	—	July 31, 2000	Socorro	LINEAR	·	2.3 km	MPC · JPL
38648	2000 OG_{11}	—	July 23, 2000	Socorro	LINEAR	NYS	2.6 km	MPC · JPL
38649	2000 OX_{16}	—	July 23, 2000	Socorro	LINEAR	·	6.2 km	MPC · JPL
38650	2000 ON_{17}	—	July 23, 2000	Socorro	LINEAR	ADE	6.8 km	MPC · JPL
38651	2000 ON_{18}	—	July 23, 2000	Socorro	LINEAR	·	2.4 km	MPC · JPL
38652	2000 OV_{20}	—	July 31, 2000	Socorro	LINEAR	·	2.5 km	MPC · JPL
38653	2000 OT_{22}	—	July 31, 2000	Socorro	LINEAR	·	3.5 km	MPC · JPL
38654	2000 OK_{27}	—	July 23, 2000	Socorro	LINEAR	NYS	2.9 km	MPC · JPL
38655	2000 OX_{38}	—	July 30, 2000	Socorro	LINEAR	EUN	3.8 km	MPC · JPL
38656	2000 OR_{45}	—	July 30, 2000	Socorro	LINEAR	·	7.7 km	MPC · JPL
38657	2000 OO_{46}	—	July 31, 2000	Socorro	LINEAR	·	3.0 km	MPC · JPL
38658	2000 ON_{48}	—	July 31, 2000	Socorro	LINEAR	·	2.2 km	MPC · JPL
38659	2000 OS_{48}	—	July 31, 2000	Socorro	LINEAR	·	4.8 km	MPC · JPL
38660	2000 OT_{48}	—	July 31, 2000	Socorro	LINEAR	EUN	3.0 km	MPC · JPL
38661	2000 OC_{49}	—	July 31, 2000	Socorro	LINEAR	·	2.3 km	MPC · JPL
38662	2000 OG_{49}	—	July 31, 2000	Socorro	LINEAR	·	2.1 km	MPC · JPL
38663	2000 OK_{49}	—	July 31, 2000	Socorro	LINEAR	·	4.2 km	MPC · JPL
38664	2000 OU_{50}	—	July 31, 2000	Socorro	LINEAR	·	2.4 km	MPC · JPL
38665	2000 OC_{52}	—	July 31, 2000	Socorro	LINEAR	·	3.2 km	MPC · JPL
38666	2000 OR_{52}	—	July 31, 2000	Socorro	LINEAR	NYS	3.6 km	MPC · JPL
38667 de Lignie	2000 OT_{56}	de Lignie	July 29, 2000	Anderson Mesa	LONEOS	·	2.0 km	MPC · JPL
38668	2000 PM	—	August 1, 2000	Reedy Creek	J. Broughton	·	3.8 km	MPC · JPL
38669 Michikawa	2000 PX_{3}	Michikawa	August 3, 2000	Bisei SG Center	BATTeRS	·	3.1 km	MPC · JPL
38670	2000 PR_{6}	—	August 3, 2000	Socorro	LINEAR	·	6.9 km	MPC · JPL
38671 Verdaguer	2000 PZ_{6}	Verdaguer	August 7, 2000	Ametlla de Mar	J. Nomen	NYS	3.7 km	MPC · JPL
38672	2000 PN_{7}	—	August 2, 2000	Socorro	LINEAR	·	4.5 km	MPC · JPL
38673	2000 PC_{8}	—	August 3, 2000	Socorro	LINEAR	MAS	2.2 km	MPC · JPL
38674 Těšínsko	2000 PT_{8}	Těšínsko	August 9, 2000	Ondřejov	L. Kotková	·	2.0 km	MPC · JPL
38675	2000 PT_{10}	—	August 1, 2000	Socorro	LINEAR	·	3.8 km	MPC · JPL
38676	2000 PR_{15}	—	August 1, 2000	Socorro	LINEAR	·	2.2 km	MPC · JPL
38677	2000 PD_{25}	—	August 3, 2000	Socorro	LINEAR	NYS · fast	2.7 km	MPC · JPL
38678	2000 PS_{26}	—	August 5, 2000	Haleakala	NEAT	ADE	7.2 km	MPC · JPL
38679	2000 QX	—	August 22, 2000	Gnosca	S. Sposetti	·	2.2 km	MPC · JPL
38680	2000 QM_{2}	—	August 24, 2000	Socorro	LINEAR	(883)	3.1 km	MPC · JPL
38681	2000 QK_{6}	—	August 24, 2000	Starkenburg Observatory	Starkenburg	·	3.0 km	MPC · JPL
38682	2000 QE_{7}	—	August 24, 2000	Socorro	LINEAR	H	1.4 km	MPC · JPL
38683	2000 QQ_{7}	—	August 25, 2000	Socorro	LINEAR	·	2.1 km	MPC · JPL
38684 Velehrad	2000 QK_{9}	Velehrad	August 25, 2000	Ondřejov	P. Pravec, P. Kušnirák	3:2 · SHU	13 km	MPC · JPL
38685	2000 QP_{9}	—	August 26, 2000	Ondřejov	P. Kušnirák, P. Pravec	·	4.0 km	MPC · JPL
38686	2000 QE_{10}	—	August 24, 2000	Socorro	LINEAR	·	2.6 km	MPC · JPL
38687	2000 QT_{18}	—	August 24, 2000	Socorro	LINEAR	·	2.2 km	MPC · JPL
38688	2000 QS_{23}	—	August 25, 2000	Socorro	LINEAR	NYS	4.4 km	MPC · JPL
38689	2000 QS_{27}	—	August 24, 2000	Socorro	LINEAR	·	1.7 km	MPC · JPL
38690	2000 QS_{29}	—	August 24, 2000	Socorro	LINEAR	·	3.7 km	MPC · JPL
38691	2000 QY_{29}	—	August 25, 2000	Socorro	LINEAR	V	2.2 km	MPC · JPL
38692	2000 QD_{30}	—	August 25, 2000	Socorro	LINEAR	·	4.3 km	MPC · JPL
38693	2000 QB_{36}	—	August 24, 2000	Socorro	LINEAR	·	1.8 km	MPC · JPL
38694	2000 QO_{46}	—	August 24, 2000	Socorro	LINEAR	·	2.6 km	MPC · JPL
38695	2000 QQ_{50}	—	August 24, 2000	Socorro	LINEAR	NYS	3.2 km	MPC · JPL
38696	2000 QR_{58}	—	August 26, 2000	Socorro	LINEAR	V	1.5 km	MPC · JPL
38697	2000 QM_{62}	—	August 28, 2000	Socorro	LINEAR	·	1.6 km	MPC · JPL
38698	2000 QU_{63}	—	August 28, 2000	Socorro	LINEAR	·	2.3 km	MPC · JPL
38699	2000 QX_{63}	—	August 28, 2000	Socorro	LINEAR	·	2.2 km	MPC · JPL
38700	2000 QL_{65}	—	August 28, 2000	Socorro	LINEAR	·	2.0 km	MPC · JPL

== 38701–38800 ==
back to top

Designation			Discovery			Properties		Ref
Permanent	Provisional	Named after	Date	Site	Discoverer(s)	Category	Diam.	Ref
38701	2000 QB_{66}	—	August 28, 2000	Socorro	LINEAR	HIL · 3:2 · (6124) · slow	22 km	MPC · JPL
38702	2000 QX_{66}	—	August 28, 2000	Socorro	LINEAR	NYS	3.0 km	MPC · JPL
38703	2000 QR_{72}	—	August 24, 2000	Socorro	LINEAR	·	1.5 km	MPC · JPL
38704	2000 QZ_{76}	—	August 24, 2000	Socorro	LINEAR	NYS	2.9 km	MPC · JPL
38705	2000 QU_{80}	—	August 24, 2000	Socorro	LINEAR	·	2.9 km	MPC · JPL
38706	2000 QP_{83}	—	August 24, 2000	Socorro	LINEAR	V	2.5 km	MPC · JPL
38707	2000 QK_{89}	—	August 25, 2000	Socorro	LINEAR	V	2.3 km	MPC · JPL
38708	2000 QQ_{89}	—	August 25, 2000	Socorro	LINEAR	·	1.8 km	MPC · JPL
38709	2000 QO_{90}	—	August 25, 2000	Socorro	LINEAR	T_{j} (2.99) · 3:2	13 km	MPC · JPL
38710	2000 QG_{97}	—	August 28, 2000	Socorro	LINEAR	(2076)	2.5 km	MPC · JPL
38711	2000 QU_{97}	—	August 28, 2000	Socorro	LINEAR	·	4.7 km	MPC · JPL
38712	2000 QP_{103}	—	August 28, 2000	Socorro	LINEAR	·	2.0 km	MPC · JPL
38713	2000 QJ_{116}	—	August 28, 2000	Socorro	LINEAR	·	2.3 km	MPC · JPL
38714	2000 QS_{116}	—	August 28, 2000	Socorro	LINEAR	·	3.7 km	MPC · JPL
38715	2000 QY_{120}	—	August 25, 2000	Socorro	LINEAR	·	3.4 km	MPC · JPL
38716	2000 QL_{121}	—	August 25, 2000	Socorro	LINEAR	·	3.4 km	MPC · JPL
38717	2000 QM_{121}	—	August 25, 2000	Socorro	LINEAR	·	9.8 km	MPC · JPL
38718	2000 QW_{121}	—	August 25, 2000	Socorro	LINEAR	(5)	3.4 km	MPC · JPL
38719	2000 QQ_{127}	—	August 24, 2000	Socorro	LINEAR	·	2.8 km	MPC · JPL
38720	2000 QB_{128}	—	August 24, 2000	Socorro	LINEAR	·	3.5 km	MPC · JPL
38721	2000 QQ_{128}	—	August 25, 2000	Socorro	LINEAR	·	4.5 km	MPC · JPL
38722	2000 QU_{128}	—	August 25, 2000	Socorro	LINEAR	·	3.3 km	MPC · JPL
38723	2000 QT_{129}	—	August 30, 2000	Višnjan Observatory	K. Korlević	V	3.4 km	MPC · JPL
38724	2000 QW_{129}	—	August 31, 2000	Reedy Creek	J. Broughton	·	3.8 km	MPC · JPL
38725	2000 QD_{130}	—	August 31, 2000	Socorro	LINEAR	·	6.9 km	MPC · JPL
38726	2000 QQ_{131}	—	August 24, 2000	Socorro	LINEAR	V	2.1 km	MPC · JPL
38727	2000 QR_{131}	—	August 25, 2000	Socorro	LINEAR	·	1.4 km	MPC · JPL
38728	2000 QJ_{133}	—	August 26, 2000	Socorro	LINEAR	·	1.5 km	MPC · JPL
38729	2000 QP_{137}	—	August 31, 2000	Socorro	LINEAR	·	1.6 km	MPC · JPL
38730	2000 QE_{138}	—	August 31, 2000	Socorro	LINEAR	·	2.3 km	MPC · JPL
38731	2000 QX_{138}	—	August 31, 2000	Socorro	LINEAR	NYS	3.7 km	MPC · JPL
38732	2000 QF_{140}	—	August 31, 2000	Socorro	LINEAR	·	3.5 km	MPC · JPL
38733	2000 QF_{141}	—	August 31, 2000	Socorro	LINEAR	V	1.8 km	MPC · JPL
38734	2000 QC_{143}	—	August 31, 2000	Socorro	LINEAR	NYS ·	3.5 km	MPC · JPL
38735	2000 QQ_{144}	—	August 31, 2000	Socorro	LINEAR	·	5.8 km	MPC · JPL
38736	2000 QU_{144}	—	August 31, 2000	Socorro	LINEAR	·	2.2 km	MPC · JPL
38737	2000 QN_{146}	—	August 31, 2000	Socorro	LINEAR	·	1.8 km	MPC · JPL
38738	2000 QT_{146}	—	August 31, 2000	Socorro	LINEAR	PHO	2.6 km	MPC · JPL
38739	2000 QO_{149}	—	August 24, 2000	Socorro	LINEAR	·	2.1 km	MPC · JPL
38740	2000 QC_{152}	—	August 26, 2000	Socorro	LINEAR	NYS	1.9 km	MPC · JPL
38741	2000 QO_{180}	—	August 31, 2000	Socorro	LINEAR	EUN	5.0 km	MPC · JPL
38742	2000 QP_{184}	—	August 26, 2000	Socorro	LINEAR	·	4.6 km	MPC · JPL
38743	2000 QB_{185}	—	August 26, 2000	Socorro	LINEAR	·	3.0 km	MPC · JPL
38744	2000 QE_{186}	—	August 26, 2000	Socorro	LINEAR	·	2.5 km	MPC · JPL
38745	2000 QM_{186}	—	August 26, 2000	Socorro	LINEAR	·	2.4 km	MPC · JPL
38746	2000 QT_{186}	—	August 26, 2000	Socorro	LINEAR	·	3.6 km	MPC · JPL
38747	2000 QE_{190}	—	August 26, 2000	Socorro	LINEAR	·	2.4 km	MPC · JPL
38748	2000 QY_{191}	—	August 26, 2000	Socorro	LINEAR	·	1.9 km	MPC · JPL
38749	2000 QU_{206}	—	August 31, 2000	Socorro	LINEAR	·	2.3 km	MPC · JPL
38750	2000 QJ_{207}	—	August 31, 2000	Socorro	LINEAR	·	2.9 km	MPC · JPL
38751	2000 QN_{207}	—	August 31, 2000	Socorro	LINEAR	·	1.6 km	MPC · JPL
38752	2000 QY_{207}	—	August 31, 2000	Socorro	LINEAR	MAS ·	1.6 km	MPC · JPL
38753	2000 QE_{217}	—	August 31, 2000	Socorro	LINEAR	·	1.5 km	MPC · JPL
38754	2000 QG_{217}	—	August 31, 2000	Socorro	LINEAR	·	1.8 km	MPC · JPL
38755	2000 QR_{227}	—	August 31, 2000	Socorro	LINEAR	(5)	2.6 km	MPC · JPL
38756	2000 QG_{228}	—	August 31, 2000	Socorro	LINEAR	·	2.1 km	MPC · JPL
38757	2000 RM_{1}	—	September 1, 2000	Socorro	LINEAR	NYS	2.8 km	MPC · JPL
38758	2000 RS_{2}	—	September 1, 2000	Socorro	LINEAR	·	2.7 km	MPC · JPL
38759	2000 RD_{3}	—	September 1, 2000	Socorro	LINEAR	·	3.4 km	MPC · JPL
38760	2000 RG_{3}	—	September 1, 2000	Socorro	LINEAR	·	3.6 km	MPC · JPL
38761	2000 RH_{3}	—	September 1, 2000	Socorro	LINEAR	·	8.0 km	MPC · JPL
38762	2000 RK_{4}	—	September 1, 2000	Socorro	LINEAR	·	4.0 km	MPC · JPL
38763	2000 RW_{5}	—	September 1, 2000	Socorro	LINEAR	MAS	2.5 km	MPC · JPL
38764	2000 RB_{6}	—	September 1, 2000	Socorro	LINEAR	·	5.4 km	MPC · JPL
38765	2000 RU_{6}	—	September 1, 2000	Socorro	LINEAR	·	5.2 km	MPC · JPL
38766	2000 RV_{6}	—	September 1, 2000	Socorro	LINEAR	·	2.7 km	MPC · JPL
38767	2000 RB_{7}	—	September 1, 2000	Socorro	LINEAR	(5)	3.3 km	MPC · JPL
38768	2000 RF_{7}	—	September 1, 2000	Socorro	LINEAR	MAS	2.6 km	MPC · JPL
38769	2000 RS_{7}	—	September 1, 2000	Socorro	LINEAR	·	8.0 km	MPC · JPL
38770	2000 RT_{8}	—	September 1, 2000	Socorro	LINEAR	·	7.3 km	MPC · JPL
38771	2000 RP_{9}	—	September 1, 2000	Socorro	LINEAR	NYS	3.1 km	MPC · JPL
38772	2000 RR_{9}	—	September 1, 2000	Socorro	LINEAR	·	3.6 km	MPC · JPL
38773	2000 RY_{9}	—	September 1, 2000	Socorro	LINEAR	·	3.7 km	MPC · JPL
38774	2000 RD_{10}	—	September 1, 2000	Socorro	LINEAR	·	3.6 km	MPC · JPL
38775	2000 RZ_{10}	—	September 1, 2000	Socorro	LINEAR	·	4.6 km	MPC · JPL
38776	2000 RK_{11}	—	September 1, 2000	Socorro	LINEAR	·	1.7 km	MPC · JPL
38777	2000 RS_{17}	—	September 1, 2000	Socorro	LINEAR	·	2.4 km	MPC · JPL
38778	2000 RX_{19}	—	September 1, 2000	Socorro	LINEAR	V	2.0 km	MPC · JPL
38779	2000 RH_{22}	—	September 1, 2000	Socorro	LINEAR	·	1.7 km	MPC · JPL
38780	2000 RX_{30}	—	September 1, 2000	Socorro	LINEAR	V	1.9 km	MPC · JPL
38781	2000 RN_{31}	—	September 1, 2000	Socorro	LINEAR	·	2.7 km	MPC · JPL
38782	2000 RP_{31}	—	September 1, 2000	Socorro	LINEAR	·	3.9 km	MPC · JPL
38783	2000 RU_{35}	—	September 2, 2000	Socorro	LINEAR	·	4.1 km	MPC · JPL
38784	2000 RT_{42}	—	September 3, 2000	Socorro	LINEAR	·	2.3 km	MPC · JPL
38785	2000 RR_{43}	—	September 3, 2000	Socorro	LINEAR	·	6.2 km	MPC · JPL
38786	2000 RG_{45}	—	September 3, 2000	Socorro	LINEAR	V	2.1 km	MPC · JPL
38787	2000 RU_{45}	—	September 3, 2000	Socorro	LINEAR	V	1.8 km	MPC · JPL
38788	2000 RW_{45}	—	September 3, 2000	Socorro	LINEAR	·	4.1 km	MPC · JPL
38789	2000 RB_{46}	—	September 3, 2000	Socorro	LINEAR	·	5.4 km	MPC · JPL
38790	2000 RE_{46}	—	September 3, 2000	Socorro	LINEAR	·	5.3 km	MPC · JPL
38791	2000 RU_{46}	—	September 3, 2000	Socorro	LINEAR	·	6.3 km	MPC · JPL
38792	2000 RA_{49}	—	September 4, 2000	Socorro	LINEAR	GEF	3.5 km	MPC · JPL
38793	2000 RY_{49}	—	September 5, 2000	Socorro	LINEAR	·	2.2 km	MPC · JPL
38794	2000 RC_{50}	—	September 5, 2000	Socorro	LINEAR	·	3.5 km	MPC · JPL
38795	2000 RA_{51}	—	September 5, 2000	Socorro	LINEAR	·	4.9 km	MPC · JPL
38796	2000 RK_{51}	—	September 5, 2000	Socorro	LINEAR	·	6.0 km	MPC · JPL
38797	2000 RW_{51}	—	September 5, 2000	Socorro	LINEAR	·	3.0 km	MPC · JPL
38798	2000 RB_{54}	—	September 1, 2000	Socorro	LINEAR	·	4.4 km	MPC · JPL
38799	2000 RE_{54}	—	September 1, 2000	Socorro	LINEAR	WIT	3.1 km	MPC · JPL
38800	2000 RA_{55}	—	September 3, 2000	Socorro	LINEAR	·	6.2 km	MPC · JPL

== 38801–38900 ==
back to top

Designation			Discovery			Properties		Ref
Permanent	Provisional	Named after	Date	Site	Discoverer(s)	Category	Diam.	Ref
38801	2000 RS_{55}	—	September 4, 2000	Socorro	LINEAR	·	3.0 km	MPC · JPL
38802	2000 RW_{60}	—	September 6, 2000	Socorro	LINEAR	·	2.5 km	MPC · JPL
38803	2000 RH_{62}	—	September 1, 2000	Socorro	LINEAR	NYS	3.3 km	MPC · JPL
38804	2000 RB_{64}	—	September 3, 2000	Socorro	LINEAR	V	2.2 km	MPC · JPL
38805	2000 RL_{65}	—	September 1, 2000	Socorro	LINEAR	·	2.1 km	MPC · JPL
38806	2000 RH_{66}	—	September 1, 2000	Socorro	LINEAR	·	2.3 km	MPC · JPL
38807	2000 RM_{68}	—	September 2, 2000	Socorro	LINEAR	·	5.2 km	MPC · JPL
38808	2000 RX_{68}	—	September 2, 2000	Socorro	LINEAR	NYS	2.4 km	MPC · JPL
38809	2000 RT_{69}	—	September 2, 2000	Socorro	LINEAR	EOS	7.4 km	MPC · JPL
38810	2000 RP_{70}	—	September 2, 2000	Socorro	LINEAR	·	4.4 km	MPC · JPL
38811	2000 RW_{71}	—	September 2, 2000	Socorro	LINEAR	·	4.6 km	MPC · JPL
38812	2000 RL_{72}	—	September 2, 2000	Socorro	LINEAR	·	3.4 km	MPC · JPL
38813	2000 RP_{72}	—	September 2, 2000	Socorro	LINEAR	MAS	3.2 km	MPC · JPL
38814	2000 RR_{72}	—	September 2, 2000	Socorro	LINEAR	·	4.0 km	MPC · JPL
38815	2000 RY_{73}	—	September 2, 2000	Socorro	LINEAR	·	4.6 km	MPC · JPL
38816	2000 RZ_{73}	—	September 2, 2000	Socorro	LINEAR	·	2.9 km	MPC · JPL
38817	2000 RH_{74}	—	September 2, 2000	Socorro	LINEAR	·	2.7 km	MPC · JPL
38818	2000 RJ_{74}	—	September 2, 2000	Socorro	LINEAR	·	3.0 km	MPC · JPL
38819	2000 RX_{75}	—	September 3, 2000	Socorro	LINEAR	·	4.2 km	MPC · JPL
38820	2000 RB_{77}	—	September 7, 2000	Socorro	LINEAR	V	2.1 km	MPC · JPL
38821 Linchinghsia	2000 RJ_{78}	Linchinghsia	September 9, 2000	Desert Beaver	W. K. Y. Yeung	·	2.5 km	MPC · JPL
38822	2000 RY_{83}	—	September 1, 2000	Socorro	LINEAR	V	1.9 km	MPC · JPL
38823 Nijland	2000 RN_{87}	Nijland	September 2, 2000	Anderson Mesa	LONEOS	·	4.4 km	MPC · JPL
38824	2000 RG_{91}	—	September 3, 2000	Socorro	LINEAR	·	1.7 km	MPC · JPL
38825	2000 RS_{91}	—	September 3, 2000	Socorro	LINEAR	·	3.2 km	MPC · JPL
38826	2000 RZ_{92}	—	September 3, 2000	Socorro	LINEAR	·	3.3 km	MPC · JPL
38827 ter Kuile	2000 RQ_{93}	ter Kuile	September 4, 2000	Anderson Mesa	LONEOS	·	1.9 km	MPC · JPL
38828 van ’t Leven	2000 RQ_{94}	van ’t Leven	September 4, 2000	Anderson Mesa	LONEOS	·	2.4 km	MPC · JPL
38829 Vandeputte	2000 RQ_{96}	Vandeputte	September 4, 2000	Anderson Mesa	LONEOS	·	2.0 km	MPC · JPL
38830 Biets	2000 RK_{99}	Biets	September 5, 2000	Anderson Mesa	LONEOS	T_{j} (2.97) · 3:2	13 km	MPC · JPL
38831	2000 RC_{105}	—	September 7, 2000	Socorro	LINEAR	EUN	3.6 km	MPC · JPL
38832	2000 RH_{105}	—	September 7, 2000	Socorro	LINEAR	·	6.6 km	MPC · JPL
38833	2000 SC	—	September 17, 2000	Socorro	LINEAR	·	10 km	MPC · JPL
38834	2000 SP_{1}	—	September 18, 2000	Socorro	LINEAR	·	8.2 km	MPC · JPL
38835	2000 SS_{2}	—	September 20, 2000	Haleakala	NEAT	EUN	3.3 km	MPC · JPL
38836	2000 SS_{19}	—	September 23, 2000	Socorro	LINEAR	·	5.3 km	MPC · JPL
38837	2000 SM_{23}	—	September 26, 2000	Višnjan Observatory	K. Korlević	·	4.6 km	MPC · JPL
38838	2000 SB_{31}	—	September 24, 2000	Socorro	LINEAR	·	1.6 km	MPC · JPL
38839	2000 SU_{32}	—	September 24, 2000	Socorro	LINEAR	·	1.8 km	MPC · JPL
38840	2000 SH_{39}	—	September 24, 2000	Socorro	LINEAR	EUN	4.4 km	MPC · JPL
38841	2000 SH_{43}	—	September 26, 2000	Črni Vrh	Mikuž, H.	V	2.2 km	MPC · JPL
38842	2000 SW_{44}	—	September 26, 2000	Nachi-Katsuura	Nachi-Katsuura	·	1.8 km	MPC · JPL
38843	2000 SN_{49}	—	September 23, 2000	Socorro	LINEAR	(2076)	2.0 km	MPC · JPL
38844	2000 SW_{58}	—	September 24, 2000	Socorro	LINEAR	·	1.4 km	MPC · JPL
38845	2000 SL_{59}	—	September 24, 2000	Socorro	LINEAR	·	2.4 km	MPC · JPL
38846	2000 SH_{68}	—	September 24, 2000	Socorro	LINEAR	NYS	2.5 km	MPC · JPL
38847	2000 SJ_{68}	—	September 24, 2000	Socorro	LINEAR	·	2.4 km	MPC · JPL
38848	2000 SN_{68}	—	September 24, 2000	Socorro	LINEAR	·	2.0 km	MPC · JPL
38849	2000 SS_{68}	—	September 24, 2000	Socorro	LINEAR	·	2.5 km	MPC · JPL
38850	2000 SW_{68}	—	September 24, 2000	Socorro	LINEAR	·	1.7 km	MPC · JPL
38851	2000 SM_{69}	—	September 24, 2000	Socorro	LINEAR	·	2.4 km	MPC · JPL
38852	2000 SR_{70}	—	September 24, 2000	Socorro	LINEAR	(5)	3.2 km	MPC · JPL
38853	2000 SW_{71}	—	September 24, 2000	Socorro	LINEAR	EUN	3.0 km	MPC · JPL
38854	2000 SY_{71}	—	September 24, 2000	Socorro	LINEAR	NYS	3.1 km	MPC · JPL
38855	2000 SY_{81}	—	September 24, 2000	Socorro	LINEAR	·	2.4 km	MPC · JPL
38856	2000 SH_{87}	—	September 24, 2000	Socorro	LINEAR	·	2.4 km	MPC · JPL
38857	2000 SE_{88}	—	September 24, 2000	Socorro	LINEAR	DOR	6.8 km	MPC · JPL
38858	2000 SB_{91}	—	September 22, 2000	Socorro	LINEAR	slow	10 km	MPC · JPL
38859	2000 SL_{92}	—	September 23, 2000	Socorro	LINEAR	·	6.8 km	MPC · JPL
38860	2000 SH_{100}	—	September 23, 2000	Socorro	LINEAR	·	3.0 km	MPC · JPL
38861	2000 SB_{104}	—	September 24, 2000	Socorro	LINEAR	·	2.4 km	MPC · JPL
38862	2000 SD_{105}	—	September 24, 2000	Socorro	LINEAR	NYS	2.7 km	MPC · JPL
38863	2000 SX_{108}	—	September 24, 2000	Socorro	LINEAR	·	4.9 km	MPC · JPL
38864	2000 SZ_{108}	—	September 24, 2000	Socorro	LINEAR	·	2.8 km	MPC · JPL
38865	2000 SD_{111}	—	September 24, 2000	Socorro	LINEAR	·	1.9 km	MPC · JPL
38866	2000 SK_{111}	—	September 24, 2000	Socorro	LINEAR	·	2.4 km	MPC · JPL
38867	2000 SF_{112}	—	September 24, 2000	Socorro	LINEAR	·	5.1 km	MPC · JPL
38868	2000 SX_{112}	—	September 24, 2000	Socorro	LINEAR	·	2.3 km	MPC · JPL
38869	2000 SL_{113}	—	September 24, 2000	Socorro	LINEAR	(2076)	3.5 km	MPC · JPL
38870	2000 SQ_{114}	—	September 24, 2000	Socorro	LINEAR	·	3.5 km	MPC · JPL
38871	2000 SO_{115}	—	September 24, 2000	Socorro	LINEAR	·	7.3 km	MPC · JPL
38872	2000 SP_{116}	—	September 24, 2000	Socorro	LINEAR	THM	8.5 km	MPC · JPL
38873	2000 SB_{117}	—	September 24, 2000	Socorro	LINEAR	·	3.1 km	MPC · JPL
38874	2000 SZ_{119}	—	September 24, 2000	Socorro	LINEAR	·	1.7 km	MPC · JPL
38875	2000 SA_{120}	—	September 24, 2000	Socorro	LINEAR	·	5.8 km	MPC · JPL
38876	2000 SX_{120}	—	September 24, 2000	Socorro	LINEAR	V	1.6 km	MPC · JPL
38877	2000 SE_{121}	—	September 24, 2000	Socorro	LINEAR	·	2.3 km	MPC · JPL
38878	2000 SL_{121}	—	September 24, 2000	Socorro	LINEAR	·	3.7 km	MPC · JPL
38879	2000 SO_{121}	—	September 24, 2000	Socorro	LINEAR	V	1.9 km	MPC · JPL
38880	2000 SD_{123}	—	September 24, 2000	Socorro	LINEAR	·	5.1 km	MPC · JPL
38881	2000 SE_{123}	—	September 24, 2000	Socorro	LINEAR	·	2.3 km	MPC · JPL
38882	2000 SG_{123}	—	September 24, 2000	Socorro	LINEAR	·	2.4 km	MPC · JPL
38883	2000 SZ_{123}	—	September 24, 2000	Socorro	LINEAR	·	4.4 km	MPC · JPL
38884	2000 SF_{124}	—	September 24, 2000	Socorro	LINEAR	·	2.7 km	MPC · JPL
38885	2000 SG_{126}	—	September 24, 2000	Socorro	LINEAR	·	4.9 km	MPC · JPL
38886	2000 SW_{126}	—	September 24, 2000	Socorro	LINEAR	·	5.2 km	MPC · JPL
38887	2000 SN_{134}	—	September 23, 2000	Socorro	LINEAR	·	6.5 km	MPC · JPL
38888	2000 SA_{137}	—	September 23, 2000	Socorro	LINEAR	·	3.5 km	MPC · JPL
38889	2000 SJ_{146}	—	September 24, 2000	Socorro	LINEAR	V	1.8 km	MPC · JPL
38890	2000 SO_{146}	—	September 24, 2000	Socorro	LINEAR	·	3.4 km	MPC · JPL
38891	2000 SO_{148}	—	September 24, 2000	Socorro	LINEAR	·	4.5 km	MPC · JPL
38892	2000 SS_{148}	—	September 24, 2000	Socorro	LINEAR	HNS	3.2 km	MPC · JPL
38893	2000 SH_{149}	—	September 24, 2000	Socorro	LINEAR	·	2.5 km	MPC · JPL
38894	2000 SC_{152}	—	September 24, 2000	Socorro	LINEAR	·	5.7 km	MPC · JPL
38895	2000 SE_{152}	—	September 24, 2000	Socorro	LINEAR	V	1.9 km	MPC · JPL
38896	2000 SB_{153}	—	September 24, 2000	Socorro	LINEAR	·	2.1 km	MPC · JPL
38897	2000 SO_{154}	—	September 24, 2000	Socorro	LINEAR	MAS	2.3 km	MPC · JPL
38898	2000 SD_{155}	—	September 24, 2000	Socorro	LINEAR	NYS	2.7 km	MPC · JPL
38899	2000 SG_{157}	—	September 26, 2000	Socorro	LINEAR	·	2.0 km	MPC · JPL
38900	2000 SH_{157}	—	September 26, 2000	Socorro	LINEAR	·	4.5 km	MPC · JPL

== 38901–39000 ==
back to top

Designation			Discovery			Properties		Ref
Permanent	Provisional	Named after	Date	Site	Discoverer(s)	Category	Diam.	Ref
38901	2000 SQ_{157}	—	September 27, 2000	Socorro	LINEAR	·	2.3 km	MPC · JPL
38902	2000 SO_{158}	—	September 22, 2000	Kitt Peak	Spacewatch	HNS	2.2 km	MPC · JPL
38903	2000 SP_{160}	—	September 27, 2000	Socorro	LINEAR	AEG	11 km	MPC · JPL
38904	2000 SG_{162}	—	September 21, 2000	Haleakala	NEAT	·	5.4 km	MPC · JPL
38905	2000 SW_{167}	—	September 23, 2000	Socorro	LINEAR	·	2.7 km	MPC · JPL
38906	2000 SE_{169}	—	September 23, 2000	Socorro	LINEAR	V	2.0 km	MPC · JPL
38907	2000 SC_{170}	—	September 24, 2000	Socorro	LINEAR	·	4.4 km	MPC · JPL
38908	2000 SX_{170}	—	September 24, 2000	Socorro	LINEAR	·	3.1 km	MPC · JPL
38909	2000 SQ_{172}	—	September 27, 2000	Socorro	LINEAR	EOS	15 km	MPC · JPL
38910	2000 SA_{178}	—	September 28, 2000	Socorro	LINEAR	EOS	5.5 km	MPC · JPL
38911	2000 SW_{178}	—	September 28, 2000	Socorro	LINEAR	·	3.5 km	MPC · JPL
38912	2000 SK_{179}	—	September 28, 2000	Socorro	LINEAR	·	8.3 km	MPC · JPL
38913	2000 SY_{184}	—	September 20, 2000	Haleakala	NEAT	EUN	2.9 km	MPC · JPL
38914	2000 SQ_{186}	—	September 21, 2000	Kitt Peak	Spacewatch	·	3.1 km	MPC · JPL
38915	2000 SR_{189}	—	September 22, 2000	Haleakala	NEAT	·	6.2 km	MPC · JPL
38916	2000 SY_{189}	—	September 22, 2000	Haleakala	NEAT	·	7.5 km	MPC · JPL
38917	2000 SE_{190}	—	September 23, 2000	Kitt Peak	Spacewatch	·	3.2 km	MPC · JPL
38918	2000 SS_{205}	—	September 24, 2000	Socorro	LINEAR	NYS	2.5 km	MPC · JPL
38919	2000 SS_{218}	—	September 26, 2000	Socorro	LINEAR	EUN	4.7 km	MPC · JPL
38920	2000 SW_{218}	—	September 26, 2000	Socorro	LINEAR	·	3.4 km	MPC · JPL
38921	2000 SG_{219}	—	September 26, 2000	Socorro	LINEAR	·	6.7 km	MPC · JPL
38922	2000 SF_{221}	—	September 26, 2000	Socorro	LINEAR	·	1.6 km	MPC · JPL
38923	2000 SM_{221}	—	September 26, 2000	Socorro	LINEAR	·	3.3 km	MPC · JPL
38924	2000 SB_{222}	—	September 26, 2000	Socorro	LINEAR	EOS	5.7 km	MPC · JPL
38925	2000 SE_{222}	—	September 26, 2000	Socorro	LINEAR	PHO	2.3 km	MPC · JPL
38926	2000 SH_{226}	—	September 27, 2000	Socorro	LINEAR	·	4.3 km	MPC · JPL
38927	2000 SV_{226}	—	September 27, 2000	Socorro	LINEAR	EOS	4.7 km	MPC · JPL
38928	2000 SY_{226}	—	September 27, 2000	Socorro	LINEAR	URS	7.8 km	MPC · JPL
38929	2000 SH_{227}	—	September 27, 2000	Socorro	LINEAR	EUN	3.3 km	MPC · JPL
38930	2000 SW_{230}	—	September 28, 2000	Socorro	LINEAR	·	2.6 km	MPC · JPL
38931	2000 SY_{234}	—	September 24, 2000	Socorro	LINEAR	·	6.5 km	MPC · JPL
38932	2000 SL_{236}	—	September 24, 2000	Socorro	LINEAR	PAD	3.4 km	MPC · JPL
38933	2000 SE_{237}	—	September 24, 2000	Socorro	LINEAR	·	2.4 km	MPC · JPL
38934	2000 SB_{239}	—	September 26, 2000	Socorro	LINEAR	V	1.6 km	MPC · JPL
38935	2000 SC_{239}	—	September 26, 2000	Socorro	LINEAR	DOR	7.4 km	MPC · JPL
38936	2000 SD_{258}	—	September 24, 2000	Socorro	LINEAR	(5)	2.6 km	MPC · JPL
38937	2000 SL_{258}	—	September 24, 2000	Socorro	LINEAR	·	4.9 km	MPC · JPL
38938	2000 SU_{258}	—	September 24, 2000	Socorro	LINEAR	·	1.9 km	MPC · JPL
38939	2000 SH_{260}	—	September 24, 2000	Socorro	LINEAR	·	3.9 km	MPC · JPL
38940	2000 SY_{265}	—	September 26, 2000	Socorro	LINEAR	·	2.3 km	MPC · JPL
38941	2000 SN_{269}	—	September 27, 2000	Socorro	LINEAR	·	2.5 km	MPC · JPL
38942	2000 SA_{271}	—	September 27, 2000	Socorro	LINEAR	ERI	5.0 km	MPC · JPL
38943	2000 SQ_{273}	—	September 28, 2000	Socorro	LINEAR	·	3.0 km	MPC · JPL
38944	2000 SF_{274}	—	September 28, 2000	Socorro	LINEAR	·	6.1 km	MPC · JPL
38945	2000 SO_{274}	—	September 28, 2000	Socorro	LINEAR	·	2.2 km	MPC · JPL
38946	2000 SS_{274}	—	September 28, 2000	Socorro	LINEAR	·	4.0 km	MPC · JPL
38947	2000 SD_{287}	—	September 26, 2000	Socorro	LINEAR	·	4.3 km	MPC · JPL
38948	2000 ST_{292}	—	September 27, 2000	Socorro	LINEAR	·	3.9 km	MPC · JPL
38949	2000 SJ_{295}	—	September 27, 2000	Socorro	LINEAR	·	3.3 km	MPC · JPL
38950	2000 ST_{295}	—	September 27, 2000	Socorro	LINEAR	·	3.9 km	MPC · JPL
38951	2000 SA_{296}	—	September 27, 2000	Socorro	LINEAR	·	2.7 km	MPC · JPL
38952	2000 SG_{309}	—	September 30, 2000	Socorro	LINEAR	·	1.9 km	MPC · JPL
38953	2000 SK_{310}	—	September 26, 2000	Socorro	LINEAR	PHO	2.9 km	MPC · JPL
38954	2000 SD_{313}	—	September 27, 2000	Socorro	LINEAR	MAR	3.9 km	MPC · JPL
38955	2000 SE_{319}	—	September 26, 2000	Socorro	LINEAR	·	5.1 km	MPC · JPL
38956	2000 SR_{336}	—	September 26, 2000	Haleakala	NEAT	·	3.1 km	MPC · JPL
38957	2000 SZ_{336}	—	September 26, 2000	Haleakala	NEAT	V	1.8 km	MPC · JPL
38958	2000 SL_{337}	—	September 25, 2000	Kitt Peak	Spacewatch	·	3.5 km	MPC · JPL
38959	2000 SE_{363}	—	September 20, 2000	Kitt Peak	Spacewatch	·	1.8 km	MPC · JPL
38960 Yeungchihung	2000 TS	Yeungchihung	October 2, 2000	Desert Beaver	W. K. Y. Yeung	·	7.6 km	MPC · JPL
38961	2000 TG_{1}	—	October 1, 2000	Ametlla de Mar	J. Nomen	·	2.7 km	MPC · JPL
38962 Chuwinghung	2000 TN_{2}	Chuwinghung	October 5, 2000	Desert Beaver	W. K. Y. Yeung	DOR	8.8 km	MPC · JPL
38963	2000 TJ_{14}	—	October 1, 2000	Socorro	LINEAR	KOR	3.3 km	MPC · JPL
38964	2000 TU_{18}	—	October 1, 2000	Socorro	LINEAR	·	3.3 km	MPC · JPL
38965	2000 TB_{29}	—	October 3, 2000	Socorro	LINEAR	·	3.3 km	MPC · JPL
38966 Deller	2000 TW_{35}	Deller	October 6, 2000	Anderson Mesa	LONEOS	·	4.5 km	MPC · JPL
38967 Roberthaas	2000 TF_{36}	Roberthaas	October 6, 2000	Anderson Mesa	LONEOS	slow	3.6 km	MPC · JPL
38968	2000 TF_{55}	—	October 1, 2000	Socorro	LINEAR	·	3.7 km	MPC · JPL
38969	2000 TV_{55}	—	October 1, 2000	Socorro	LINEAR	·	1.9 km	MPC · JPL
38970	2000 TC_{58}	—	October 2, 2000	Socorro	LINEAR	·	2.4 km	MPC · JPL
38971	2000 TQ_{60}	—	October 2, 2000	Anderson Mesa	LONEOS	MAR	3.1 km	MPC · JPL
38972	2000 TE_{61}	—	October 2, 2000	Anderson Mesa	LONEOS	PHO	5.4 km	MPC · JPL
38973	2000 TQ_{61}	—	October 2, 2000	Anderson Mesa	LONEOS	·	4.1 km	MPC · JPL
38974	2000 TK_{62}	—	October 2, 2000	Socorro	LINEAR	·	1.9 km	MPC · JPL
38975	2000 TH_{66}	—	October 1, 2000	Socorro	LINEAR	·	1.3 km	MPC · JPL
38976 Taeve	2000 UR	Taeve	October 21, 2000	Drebach	G. Lehmann	·	3.1 km	MPC · JPL
38977	2000 UV	—	October 21, 2000	Višnjan Observatory	K. Korlević	THM	5.6 km	MPC · JPL
38978	2000 UA_{2}	—	October 22, 2000	Višnjan Observatory	K. Korlević	·	3.9 km	MPC · JPL
38979	2000 UB_{2}	—	October 22, 2000	Višnjan Observatory	K. Korlević	·	6.9 km	MPC · JPL
38980 Gaoyaojie	2000 UJ_{2}	Gaoyaojie	October 23, 2000	Desert Beaver	W. K. Y. Yeung	·	3.4 km	MPC · JPL
38981	2000 UW_{3}	—	October 24, 2000	Socorro	LINEAR	·	10 km	MPC · JPL
38982	2000 UD_{4}	—	October 24, 2000	Socorro	LINEAR	·	2.3 km	MPC · JPL
38983	2000 UT_{4}	—	October 24, 2000	Socorro	LINEAR	NYS	2.7 km	MPC · JPL
38984	2000 UZ_{4}	—	October 24, 2000	Socorro	LINEAR	CYB · 2:1J	6.2 km	MPC · JPL
38985	2000 UA_{5}	—	October 24, 2000	Socorro	LINEAR	KOR	3.1 km	MPC · JPL
38986	2000 UP_{5}	—	October 24, 2000	Socorro	LINEAR	·	3.5 km	MPC · JPL
38987	2000 UB_{8}	—	October 24, 2000	Socorro	LINEAR	·	3.0 km	MPC · JPL
38988	2000 UJ_{12}	—	October 24, 2000	Socorro	LINEAR	·	2.8 km	MPC · JPL
38989	2000 UF_{13}	—	October 25, 2000	Socorro	LINEAR	·	3.4 km	MPC · JPL
38990	2000 UZ_{17}	—	October 24, 2000	Socorro	LINEAR	slow	3.5 km	MPC · JPL
38991	2000 UE_{19}	—	October 29, 2000	Socorro	LINEAR	ADE	11 km	MPC · JPL
38992	2000 UN_{20}	—	October 24, 2000	Socorro	LINEAR	KOR	3.1 km	MPC · JPL
38993	2000 UX_{20}	—	October 24, 2000	Socorro	LINEAR	·	2.0 km	MPC · JPL
38994	2000 UZ_{21}	—	October 24, 2000	Socorro	LINEAR	·	3.0 km	MPC · JPL
38995	2000 UJ_{24}	—	October 24, 2000	Socorro	LINEAR	·	5.5 km	MPC · JPL
38996	2000 UM_{25}	—	October 24, 2000	Socorro	LINEAR	slow	4.7 km	MPC · JPL
38997	2000 UF_{26}	—	October 24, 2000	Socorro	LINEAR	·	8.8 km	MPC · JPL
38998	2000 UP_{26}	—	October 24, 2000	Socorro	LINEAR	EUN	4.3 km	MPC · JPL
38999	2000 UV_{26}	—	October 24, 2000	Socorro	LINEAR	slow	6.4 km	MPC · JPL
39000	2000 UZ_{26}	—	October 24, 2000	Socorro	LINEAR	·	2.2 km	MPC · JPL

back to top

== See also ==
- Meanings of minor-planet names: 38001–39000
