= Meanings of minor-planet names: 38001–39000 =

As minor planet discoveries are confirmed, they are given a permanent number by the IAU's Minor Planet Center (MPC), and the discoverers can then submit names for them, following the IAU's naming conventions. The list below concerns those minor planets in the specified number-range that have received names, and explains the meanings of those names.

Official naming citations of newly named small Solar System bodies are approved and published in a bulletin by IAU's Working Group for Small Bodies Nomenclature (WGSBN). Before May 2021, citations were published in MPC's Minor Planet Circulars for many decades. Recent citations can also be found on the JPL Small-Body Database (SBDB). Until his death in 2016, German astronomer Lutz D. Schmadel compiled these citations into the Dictionary of Minor Planet Names (DMP) and regularly updated the collection.

Based on Paul Herget's The Names of the Minor Planets, Schmadel also researched the unclear origin of numerous asteroids, most of which had been named prior to World War II. This article incorporates text from this source, which is in the public domain: SBDB New namings may only be added to this list below after official publication as the preannouncement of names is condemned. The WGSBN publishes a comprehensive guideline for the naming rules of non-cometary small Solar System bodies.

== 38001–38100 ==
Named minor planet	Provisional	This minor planet was named for...	Ref · Catalog
38018 Louisneefs	1998 LN_{2}	Louis Neefs (1937–1980), a well-known Flemish singer	JPL · 38018
38019 Jeanmariepelt	1998 LV_{2}	Jean-Marie Pelt (1933–2015), French botanist at the Université de Metz, founder of the European Institute of Ecology French: Institut européen d'écologie, author of La Cannelle et le panda	JPL · 38019
38020 Hannadam	1998 MP	Hanna Smigiel (born 1971) and her son, Adam (born 1993), are Polish friends of Luciano Tesi, who co-discovered this minor planet.	JPL · 38020
38024 Melospadafora	1998 OB	Melo Spadafora (born 1962), a Panamanian amateur astronomer and member of the Panamanian Association of Amateur Astronomy (Spanish: Asociación Panameña de Aficionados a la Astronomia), who has been instrumental in the setup of the Panamanian Observatory (W95) (Observatorio Panameño en San Pedro de Atacama), in Chile. The observatory does follow-up observations of newly discovered small Solar System bodies.	IAU · 38024
38036 Waynewarren	1998 RE_{1}	Wayne H. Warren Jr. (1940–2023), an American astronomer.	IAU · 38036
38044 Michaellucas	1998 SL_{62}	Michael Lucas (born 1965) is a research associate in the Department of Earth and Planetary Sciences at the University of Tennessee. He studies the geochemical histories of asteroids using telescopic spectroscopy of asteroids and petrology and spectroscopy of analog meteorites.	IAU · 38044
38046 Krasnoyarsk	1998 SW_{144}	Krasnoyarsk, Siberia, Russia, where in 1772 the German zoologist and botanist Peter Simon Pallas identified a 700-kg stony-iron meteorite, now known as a pallasite	JPL · 38046
38048 Blumenbach	1998 UL_{18}	Ulrich Blumenbach (born 1964), German literary translator, best known for his translation of David Foster Wallace's novel Infinite Jest	IAU · 38048
38050 Bias	1998 VR_{38}	Bias from Greek mythology. He was an Athenian warrior, described as stalwart, who fought to prevent Hector from reaching the Greek ships.	IAU · 38050
38070 Redwine	1999 GG_{2}	Kelley K. Redwine (born 1974), an American occupational therapist in Tucson, Arizona	JPL · 38070
38083 Rhadamanthus	1999 HX_{11}	Rhadamanthus, mythological son of Zeus and Europa, one of the three judges of the dead in Elysium (together with Aeacus and Minos)	JPL · 38083
38086 Beowulf	1999 JB	Beowulf, hero of one of the oldest surviving texts from early Britain	JPL · 38086

== 38101–38200 ==
back to top

Named minor planet	Provisional	This minor planet was named for...	Ref · Catalog
There are no named minor planets in this number range

== 38201–38300 ==
back to top

Named minor planet	Provisional	This minor planet was named for...	Ref · Catalog
38203 Sanner	1999 MJ	Glen Sanner, American co-author of the two-volume Night Sky Observer's Guide, and member of the Huachuca Astronomy Club	MPC · 38203
38237 Roche	1999 OF	Édouard Roche (1820–1883), French astronomer and mathematician	JPL · 38237
38238 Holíč	1999 OW	The town of Holíč in western Slovakia	JPL · 38238
38245 Marcospontes	1999 PF_{4}	Marcos Pontes (born 1963), Brazilian astronaut	JPL · 38245
38246 Palupín	1999 PL_{4}	The village of Palupín in the Bohemian-Moravian Highlands. It was first mentioned in 1368. St. Wenceslaus church was built by a local landlord in 1617. The family roots of co-discoverer Jana Tichá lie in this village.	JPL · 38246
38250 Tartois	1999 QS_{2}	Lucien Tartois (1924–2011), French amateur astronomer	JPL · 38250
38268 Zenkert	1999 RV_{32}	Arnold Zenkert (1923–2013), German author, amateur astronomer, and director of the Bruno H. Bürgel Memorial Plaza in Potsdam, Germany	MPC · 38268
38269 Gueymard	1999 RN_{33}	Adolphe G. Gueymard (1913–?), American businessman, benefactor of the George Observatory	JPL · 38269
38270 Wettzell	1999 RJ_{35}	Geodetic Fundamental Station Wettzell in the Bavarian Forest, which supplies observational contributions to the International Terrestrial Reference System with satellite radio interferometry and laser ranging	JPL · 38270

== 38301–38400 ==
back to top

Named minor planet	Provisional	This minor planet was named for...	Ref · Catalog
There are no named minor planets in this number range

== 38401–38500 ==
back to top

Named minor planet	Provisional	This minor planet was named for...	Ref · Catalog
38423 Jeokjungchogye	1999 RS_{226}	Jeokchung-Chogye basin, a meteor crater in South Korea.	
38431 Jeffbeck	1999 RR_{232}	Geoffrey Arnold (Jeff) Beck (1944–2023) was an English guitarist and musician. Since the 1960s he had been widely recognized for his innovative sound and for his collaborations across a broad range of musical genres including rock, jazz fusion, blues, and instrumental. Beck is considered one of the most influential lead guitarists in history.	IAU · 38431
38442 Szilárd	1999 SU_{6}	Leó Szilárd (1898–1964), Hungarian-German-American nuclear physicist and molecular biologist	JPL · 38442
38454 Boroson	1999 TB_{2}	Todd A. Boroson (born 1954), American astronomer, deputy director of the National Optical Astronomy Observatory	JPL · 38454
38461 Jiřítrnka	1999 TR_{17}	Jiří Trnka (1912–1969), Czech graphic artist, painter, puppet-maker, film-maker, author and illustrator	JPL · 38461
38470 Deleflie	1999 TL_{36}	Florent Deleflie (born 1975) is a French astronomer at IMCCE of the Paris Observatory, specializing in celestial mechanics, dynamics of artificial satellites, and long term orbit propagation.	IAU · 38470

== 38501–38600 ==
back to top

Named minor planet	Provisional	This minor planet was named for...	Ref · Catalog
38540 Stevens	1999 VG_{2}	Berton L. Stevens (born 1951), American amateur astronomer and discoverer of minor planets at the Desert Moon Observatory near Las Cruces, New Mexico	JPL · 38540
38541 Rustichelli	1999 VT_{6}	Vittorio Rustichelli (born 1927), Italian telescope maker and amateur astronomer	JPL · 38541

== 38601–38700 ==
back to top

Named minor planet	Provisional	This minor planet was named for...	Ref · Catalog
38628 Huya	2000 EB_{173}	Huya, rain god of the Wayuu Indians of Venezuela and Colombia	JPL · 38628
38636 Kitazato	2000 LM_{27}	Kohei Kitazato (born 1980) is a planetary scientist who contributed to JAXA's Hayabusa and Hayabusa2 missions. His research includes physical and chemical properties of near-Earth asteroids.	IAU · 38636
38639 Samuels	2000 NJ_{16}	David Samuels (b. 1959), an American amateur astronomer.	IAU · 38639
38640 Rau	2000 NO_{16}	Steve Rau (b. 1972), a Belgian amateur astronomer.	IAU · 38640
38641 Philpott	2000 NX_{16}	Lydia Philpott (born 1983) is a planetary geophysicist at the University of British Columbia. Lydia is a member of the OSIRIS-Rex mission to the asteroid (101955) Bennu, where she is a critical part of the team that developed shape models.	IAU · 38641
38642 Breukers	2000 NY_{17}	Martin Breukers (b. 1961), a Dutch amateur astronomer and meteor observer.	IAU · 38642
38643 Scholten	2000 NZ_{19}	Alex Scholten (b. 1962), a Dutch amateur astronomer.	IAU · 38643
38667 de Lignie	2000 OT_{56}	Marc de Lignie (b. 1964), a Dutch physicist and an amateur astronomer.	IAU · 38667
38669 Michikawa	2000 PX_{3}	Michikawa is the name of the area in Yurihonjo City, Akita Prefecture, Japan.	JPL · 38669
38671 Verdaguer	2000 PZ_{6}	Jacint Verdaguer (1845–1902), Spanish (Catalan) poet	JPL · 38671
38674 Těšínsko	2000 PT_{8}	The region of Těšínsko in south-eastern part of Silesia, in 1920 divided between Czechoslovakia and Poland	JPL · 38674
38684 Velehrad	2000 QK_{9}	The village of Velehrad, Moravia, in the Czech Republic. It is the traditional seat of the great Moravian princes and of Archbishop Methodius	JPL · 38684

== 38701–38800 ==
back to top

Named minor planet	Provisional	This minor planet was named for...	Ref · Catalog
There are no named minor planets in this number range

== 38801–38900 ==
back to top

Named minor planet	Provisional	This minor planet was named for...	Ref · Catalog
38821 Linchinghsia	2000 RJ_{78}	Brigitte Lin (Lin Ching Hsia; born 1954), Chinese actress	JPL · 38821
38823 Nijland	2000 RN_{87}	Jos Nijland (b. 1963), a Dutch amateur astronomer.	IAU · 38823
38827 ter Kuile	2000 RQ_{93}	Casper ter Kuile (b. 1954), a Dutch amateur astronomer.	IAU · 38827
38828 van ’t Leven	2000 RQ_{94}	Jaap van 't Leven (b. 1966), a Dutch amateur meteor astronomer.	IAU · 38828
38829 Vandeputte	2000 RQ_{96}	Michel Vandeputte (b. 1977), a Dutch amateur astronomer.	IAU · 38829
38830 Biets	2000 RK_{99}	Jean Marie Biets (b. 1959), a Belgian amateur astronomer.	IAU · 38830

== 38901–39000 ==
back to top

Named minor planet	Provisional	This minor planet was named for...	Ref · Catalog
38960 Yeungchihung	2000 TS	Yeung Chi-hung (1953–2010), an avid stargazer since he was a teenager, was one of the founding members of the Hong Kong Astronomical Society.	JPL · 38960
38962 Chuwinghung	2000 TN_{2}	Chu Wing Hung (Alan Chu; born 1946), Chinese amateur astronomer, compiler of the lunar atlas	JPL · 38962
38966 Deller	2000 TW_{35}	Jakob Deller (born 1985) is a postdoctoral researcher at the Max Planck Institute in Göttingen, Germany. He studies the formation, evolution, and internal structures of near-Earth asteroids and comets from spacecraft measurements.	IAU · 38966
38967 Roberthaas	2000 TF_{36}	Robert Haas (b. 1964), a Dutch amateur astronomer.	IAU · 38967
38976 Taeve	2000 UR	Nickname of Gustav Adolf Schur (born 1931), German cyclist	JPL · 38976
38980 Gaoyaojie	2000 UJ_{2}	Gao Yaojie (born 1927), Chinese medical doctor, pioneer of AIDS prevention in China and winner of the 2001 Jonathan Mann Award for Global Health and Human Rights and of Vital Voices	JPL · 38980

back to top

Preceded by 37,001–38,000	Meanings of minor-planet names List of minor planets: 38,001–39,000	Succeeded by 39,001–40,000
