= Abaris (disambiguation) =

Abaris usually refers to Abaris the Hyperborean, a legendary sage, healer, and priest of Apollo known to the Ancient Greeks.

Abaris may also refer to:

== Mythology ==
- Abaris (Caucasian), killed by Perseus
- Abaris (Dolionian), one of the Dolionians
- Abaris (Aeneid), an ally of Turnus

== Other uses ==
- Abaris, another name of the opera Les Boréades
- Abaris Books, a US scholarly publishing house
- Abaris (beetle), genus of beetles
- Georgios Abaris, Greek footballer
- Abaris, another name of Avaris, Hyksos capital of Egypt
