= Piasus =

In Greek mythology, Piasus (Ancient Greek: Πίασος, romanized: Piasos), also known according to the Suda as Piasos the Thessalian, was the father of Larisa, wife of Cyzicus, king of the Doliones.

== Mythology ==
Strabo only gives an account pertaining Piasus in his book, Geography:

It is at the Phryconian Larissa that Piasus is said to have been honored, who, they say, was ruler of the Pelasgians and fell in love with his daughter Larisa, and, having violated her, paid the penalty for the outrage; for, observing him leaning over a cask of wine, they say, she seized him by the legs, raised him, and plunged him into the cask. Such are the ancient accounts.
