= Larissa (daughter of Piasus) =

Woman raped by her father in Greek mythology

In Greek mythology, Larissa or Larisa (Ancient Greek: Λάρισα, romanized: Lárisa) is the daughter of Piasus, a Thessalian or Anatolian king who was desired by her father and eventually was raped by him while still a maiden. Later in her life, Larissa became the wife of Cyzicus, a different Anatolian king.

== Etymology ==
The noun Λάρισα in ancient Greek meant a citadel or a fortress, and was derived from a pre-Greek substrate.

== Family ==
Larissa was the daughter of Piasus, king of the Pelasgians, though also called Piasus the Thessalian, by an unnamed mother. Her father was also said to have been honoured in Larissa Phrikonis, a Pelasgian settlement in Aeolis, an ancient region on the western coast of Asia Minor.

== Mythology ==
The young Larissa is said to have caught the eye of her father Piasus who developed a passion for her, and in his ‘unfortunate’ desire he proceeded to rape the unwilling Larissa. According to Strabo, Larissa would have her revenge when one day she observed her father leaning over a cask of wine, drinking. She quickly seized him by the legs and plunged him into the cask, causing his death by drowning.

Some unspecified time after her violation by her father, Larissa became the wife of Cyzicus, the ruler of the Dolonians (a tribe dwelling on the southern shore of the Propontis sea).

== See also ==
Other Greek mythological women desired or raped by their fathers include:

- Side
- Pelopia
- Nyctaea
- Persephone

== Bibliography ==
- Bell, Robert E. (1991). Women of Classical Mythology: A Biographical Dictionary. ABC-Clio. ISBN 9780874365818.
- Grimal, Pierre (1987). The Dictionary of Classical Mythology. Wiley-Blackwell. ISBN 0-631-13209-0.
- Liddell, Henry George; Scott, Robert (1940). A Greek-English Lexicon, revised and augmented throughout by Sir Henry Stuart Jones with the assistance of Roderick McKenzie. Oxford: Clarendon Press. Online version at Perseus.tufts project.
- Parthenius, Love Romances translated by Sir Stephen Gaselee (1882–1943), S. Loeb Classical Library Volume 69. Cambridge, MA. Harvard University Press. 1916. Online version at the Topos Text Project.
- Smith, William (1854). John Murray (ed.). Dictionary of Greek and Roman Geography. London, UK: Walton and Maberly.
- Strabo, Geographica, ed. H. L. Jones, The Geography of Strabo. Cambridge, Mass.: Harvard University Press; London: William Heinemann, Ltd. 1924. [Online text at Perseus.tufts Project.]
- Suidas, Suda Encyclopedia translated by Ross Scaife, David Whitehead, William Hutton, Catharine Roth, Jennifer Benedict, Gregory Hays, Malcolm Heath Sean M. Redmond, Nicholas Fincher, Patrick Rourke, Elizabeth Vandiver, Raphael Finkel, Frederick Williams, Carl Widstrand, Robert Dyer, Joseph L. Rife, Oliver Phillips and many others. Online version at the Topos Text Project.
