= Meanings of minor-planet names: 173001–174000 =

As minor planet discoveries are confirmed, they are given a permanent number by the IAU's Minor Planet Center (MPC), and the discoverers can then submit names for them, following the IAU's naming conventions. The list below concerns those minor planets in the specified number-range that have received names, and explains the meanings of those names.

Official naming citations of newly named small Solar System bodies are approved and published in a bulletin by IAU's Working Group for Small Bodies Nomenclature (WGSBN). Before May 2021, citations were published in MPC's Minor Planet Circulars for many decades. Recent citations can also be found on the JPL Small-Body Database (SBDB). Until his death in 2016, German astronomer Lutz D. Schmadel compiled these citations into the Dictionary of Minor Planet Names (DMP) and regularly updated the collection.

Based on Paul Herget's The Names of the Minor Planets, Schmadel also researched the unclear origin of numerous asteroids, most of which had been named prior to World War II. This article incorporates text from this source, which is in the public domain: SBDB New namings may only be added to this list below after official publication as the preannouncement of names is condemned. The WGSBN publishes a comprehensive guideline for the naming rules of non-cometary small Solar System bodies.

== 173001–173100 ==
Named minor planet	Provisional	This minor planet was named for...	Ref · Catalog
173002 Dorfi	2006 OS	Ernst Dorfi (1956-2020), Austrian professor of theoretical astrophysics at the University of Vienna, promoter of astronomy	JPL · 173002
173032 Mingus	2006 QF_{40}	Jose Antonio Lacruz Martin (born 1967), a member of the group of observers at Monte del Pardo, Madrid, who obtained his bachelor's degree in law at the Universidad Complutense de Madrid.	JPL · 173032
173086 Nireus	2007 RS_{8}	Nireus, son of Aglaea and Charopus, mythological Greek king of Syme island, killed by Eurypylos during the Trojan war	JPL · 173086
173094 Wielicki	2007 TM_{69}	Krzysztof Wielicki (born 1950) is a Polish mountaineer. He was fifth man in the world to climb all fourteen of the world's 8000-m mountains.	JPL · 173094

== 173101–173200 ==
back to top

Named minor planet	Provisional	This minor planet was named for...	Ref · Catalog
173108 Ingola	6240 P-L	Ingeborg Walpurga Gasperi (1915–2002) grew up in Germany and Switzerland. In 1942 she married Mario Gasperi, an Italian engineer and expert in the construction of airplanes.	JPL · 173108
173117 Promachus	1973 SA_{1}	Promachus, Greek warrior of the Iliad, killed by the Trojan hero Acamas	JPL · 173117

== 173201–173300 ==
back to top

Named minor planet	Provisional	This minor planet was named for...	Ref · Catalog
There are no named minor planets in this number range

== 173301–173400 ==
back to top

Named minor planet	Provisional	This minor planet was named for...	Ref · Catalog
173395 Dweinberg	2000 CJ_{149}	David Weinberg (born 1963), American astronomer with the Sloan Digital Sky Survey, known for theoretical interpretation of observed galaxy clustering	JPL · 173395

== 173401–173500 ==
back to top

Named minor planet	Provisional	This minor planet was named for...	Ref · Catalog
There are no named minor planets in this number range

== 173501–173600 ==
back to top

Named minor planet	Provisional	This minor planet was named for...	Ref · Catalog
There are no named minor planets in this number range

== 173601–173700 ==
back to top

Named minor planet	Provisional	This minor planet was named for...	Ref · Catalog
173649 Jeffreymoore	2001 FS_{184}	Jeffrey M. Moore (born 1953) is a Research Scientist at the NASA Ames Research Center, who served as a Co-Investigator and Geology Science Team Lead for the New Horizons mission to Pluto.	JPL · 173649

== 173701–173800 ==
back to top

Named minor planet	Provisional	This minor planet was named for...	Ref · Catalog
There are no named minor planets in this number range

== 173801–173900 ==
back to top

Named minor planet	Provisional	This minor planet was named for...	Ref · Catalog
173872 Andrewwest	2001 TJ_{245}	Andrew A. West (born 1977), an American astronomer with the Sloan Digital Sky Survey	JPL · 173872

== 173901–174000 ==
back to top

Named minor planet	Provisional	This minor planet was named for...	Ref · Catalog
173936 Yuribo	2001 WM_{2}	Yuribo, official mascot character of the town of Kuma Kogen, Japan	JPL · 173936

back to top

Preceded by 172,001–173,000	Meanings of minor-planet names List of minor planets: 173,001–174,000	Succeeded by 174,001–175,000
