= Acamas =

Name attributed to several characters in Greek mythology

Acamas or Akamas (/ɑːˈkɑːmɑːs/; Ancient Greek: Ἀκάμας, romanized: Akamas, lit. 'unwearying', 'untiring' or 'indefatigable') was a name attributed to several characters in Greek mythology. The following three all fought in the Trojan War, and only the first was not mentioned by Homer.

- Acamas, son of Theseus, mentioned by Virgil as being in the Trojan horse.
- Acamas, son of Antenor, fought on the side of the Trojans and killed one Greek.
- Acamas, son of Eussorus, from Thrace, and thus, could be the brother of Aenete and Cyzicus. With his comrade Peiros, son of Imbrasus, Acamas led a contingent of Thracian warriors to the Trojan War. Acamas was killed by Ajax or by Idomeneus who thrust him out of his chariot and caught him, as he fell, on the tip of his spear.

Others:

- Acamas or Acamans, a Cyclops that lived in the company of Pyracmon or Pyragmon in Pelorum (north-east coast of Sicily).
- Acamas, one of the Thebans who laid an ambush for Tydeus when he returned from Thebes. He was killed by Tydeus.
- Acamas, an Aetolian in the army of the Seven against Thebes.
- Acamas, a soldier in the army of the Seven against Thebes. When the two armies attack each other at the gates of the city, the hard-hearted Acamas pierces the Theban horseman Iphis.
- Acamas, one of the Suitors of Penelope who came from Dulichium along with either 56 other wooers (according to Apollodorus), or 51 (according to Homer). He, with the other suitors, was slain by Odysseus with the aid of Eumaeus, Philoetius, and Telemachus.
- Acamas, one of Actaeon's dogs.
