= Echeclus (mythology) =

Set index article on Greek mythology

In Greek mythology, Echeclus or Ekheklos (Ancient Greek: Ἔχεκλος, romanized: Ékheklos) may refer to the following characters:

- Echeclus, one of the centaurs who attended Pirithous' wedding and fought against the Lapiths. He was killed by the Lapith seer Ampyx who thrust a blunt lance into his face.
- Echeclus, one of the Dolionians, a people of northwestern Asia Minor visited by the Argonauts. He met his death at the hands of Ancaeus during the battle between the Dolionians and the Argonauts.
- Echeclus, son of Agenor, the son of Antenor and Theano. He was a Trojan soldier who was slain by the Achaean hero Achilles who struck him on the head with his sword.
- Echeclus, another Trojan warrior who was killed by the hero Patroclus during the Trojan War.
