= Eusorus =

In Greek mythology, Eusorus (Ancient Greek: Εύσωρος) was the father of Acamas, Aenete and in some accounts, of Cyzicus.

== Mythology ==
Eusorus only appeared in various stories as the father of certain figures otherwise he has no myth of his own:

=== Apollonius' account ===
"And about the isthmus and the plain the Doliones had their dwelling, and over them Cyzicus son of Aeneus was king, whom Aenete the daughter of goodly Eusorus bare."

=== Hyginus' account ===
"Cyzicus, son of Eusorus, king in an island of the Propontis, received the Argonauts with generous hospitality"

=== Orphic Argonautica ===
"Cyzicus, the son of Aeneus who ruled over all the Doliones, came up and took a place among the heroes. He had been born to a most noble woman, Aenete, daughter of Eusorus."

=== Apollodorus' account ===
"A period of nine years having elapsed, allies came to join the Trojans: surrounding cities,...Acamas, son of Eusorus..."
