= Abaris splendidula =

Scientific classification
- Kingdom: Animalia
- Phylum: Arthropoda
- Clade: Pancrustacea
- Class: Insecta
- Order: Coleoptera
- Suborder: Adephaga
- Family: Carabidae
- Genus: Abaris
- Species: A. splendidula

Binomial name
- Abaris splendidula (LeConte, 1863)

Synonyms
- Pterostichus splendidulus LeConte, 1863

Species of beetle

Abaris splendidula is a species of woodland ground beetle in the family Carabidae. It is found in Baja California as well as Arizona and Mexico. It lives in cool and dry habitats.
