= Opheltes (mythology) =

Greek Mythological figures

In Greek mythology, Opheltes (Ancient Greek: Ὀφέλτης, lit. 'helper' or 'benefactor') may refer to several figures in Greek mythology, including:

- Opheltes, the infant son of Lycurgus of Nemea, killed by a serpent.
- Opheltes, one of the Tyrrhenian pirates who attempted to deceive and kidnap Dionysus, and were changed by the god into fish or dolphins.
- Opheltes, the son of Peneleos, who died in the Trojan War. He was the father of Damasichthon, a king of Thebes.
- Opheltes, an experienced Trojan warrior. He was the father of Euryalus who accompanied Aeneas to Italy.
- Opheltes, a Dolionian killed by Telamon in the battle between the Dolionians and the Argonauts.
- Opheltes, son of Arestor, a soldier in the army of Dionysus during the Indian campaign, killed by Deriades.
