= Aeneus (founder of Aenus) =

Legendary figure in Greek mythology

In Greek mythology, Aeneus (Ancient Greek: Αἰνεύς) or Aineus was the legendary founder of the ancient Thracian city of Aenus (also called Poltyobria or Poltymbria). He was the father of Cyzicus by Aenete, daughter of Eusorus or by Euantheia. His parentage has been given as Apollo and Stilbe.
