= Stilbe =

Mythical character

Stilbe (/ˈstɪlbiː/; Ancient Greek: Στίλβη) in Greek mythology may refer to the following personages:

- Stilbe, mother of Callisto by Ceteus.
- Stilbe, a nymph, daughter of the river god Peneus and the Naiad Creusa. She bore Apollo twin sons, Centaurus, ancestor of the Centaurs, and Lapithus, ancestor of the Lapiths. In another version of the myth, Centaurus was instead the son of Ixion and Nephele. Aineus, father of Cyzicus, was also said to have been a son of Apollo and Stilbe. By Cychreus, she became mother of the nymph Chariclo, wife of Chiron.
- Stilbe, daughter of Eosphoros and a possible mother of Autolycus by Hermes.
