= Abaris (Dolionian) =

In Greek mythology, one of the Dolionian

- a Dolionian killed by Jason
- Abode: Island of Cyzicus in the Propontis
- Battles: Fight between Dolionians and the Argonauts

In Greek mythology, Abaris (Ancient Greek: Ἄβαρις) was one of the Dolionians, a tribe that inhabited the southern shore of the Propontis.

== Mythology ==
The Doliones were ruled by King Cyzicus who welcomed the Argonauts on their voyage to take the Golden Fleece in Colchis. After the departure of the crew of Argo, a storm drove them back to the Cyzicene coast at night. With neither the Argonauts nor King Cyzicus recognizing one another, each mistook the other as an enemy, and battle ensued. Abaris was then killed by Jason during the battle between the Dolionians and the Argonauts.

"The captain himself [i.e. Jason], lord of the field and of the battle, sweeps over heads and bodies wallowing in gore, like some black storm over the deep; Zelys and Brontes and Abaris he leaves half-dead.."
