= List of minor planets: 173001–174000 =

The following is a partial list of minor planets, running from minor-planet number 173001 through 174000, inclusive. The primary data for this and other partial lists is based on JPL's "Small-Body Orbital Elements" and data available from the Minor Planet Center. Critical list information is also provided by the MPC, unless otherwise specified from Lowell Observatory. A detailed description of the table's columns and additional sources are given on the main page including a complete list of every page in this series, and a statistical break-up on the dynamical classification of minor planets.

Also see the summary list of all named bodies in numerical and alphabetical order, and the corresponding naming citations for the number range of this particular list. New namings may only be added to this list after official publication, as the preannouncement of names is condemned by the Working Group for Small Bodies Nomenclature of the International Astronomical Union.

Near-Earth obj.	MBA (inner)	MBA (outer)	Centaur
Mars-crosser	MBA (middle)	Jupiter trojan	Trans-Neptunian obj.
Unclassified

== 173001–173100 ==
Designation			Discovery			Properties		Ref
Permanent	Provisional	Named after	Date	Site	Discoverer(s)	Category	Diam.	Ref
173001	2006 MH_{15}	—	June 20, 2006	Mount Lemmon	Mount Lemmon Survey	·	2.5 km	MPC · JPL
173002 Dorfi	2006 OS	Dorfi	July 17, 2006	Altschwendt	W. Ries	·	2.9 km	MPC · JPL
173003	2006 OD_{6}	—	July 18, 2006	Mount Lemmon	Mount Lemmon Survey	·	2.9 km	MPC · JPL
173004	2006 OH_{14}	—	July 21, 2006	Mount Lemmon	Mount Lemmon Survey	·	3.1 km	MPC · JPL
173005	2006 OQ_{20}	—	July 30, 2006	Siding Spring	SSS	·	3.5 km	MPC · JPL
173006	2006 PC_{6}	—	August 12, 2006	Palomar	NEAT	·	2.7 km	MPC · JPL
173007	2006 PU_{6}	—	August 12, 2006	Palomar	NEAT	·	1.9 km	MPC · JPL
173008	2006 PL_{9}	—	August 13, 2006	Palomar	NEAT	·	2.8 km	MPC · JPL
173009	2006 PB_{10}	—	August 13, 2006	Palomar	NEAT	·	3.1 km	MPC · JPL
173010	2006 PW_{11}	—	August 13, 2006	Palomar	NEAT	NYS	1.3 km	MPC · JPL
173011	2006 PL_{13}	—	August 14, 2006	Siding Spring	SSS	·	1.3 km	MPC · JPL
173012	2006 PG_{17}	—	August 15, 2006	Palomar	NEAT	3:2	8.8 km	MPC · JPL
173013	2006 PQ_{19}	—	August 13, 2006	Palomar	NEAT	·	1.5 km	MPC · JPL
173014	2006 PF_{22}	—	August 15, 2006	Palomar	NEAT	·	1.6 km	MPC · JPL
173015	2006 PX_{25}	—	August 13, 2006	Palomar	NEAT	HYG	4.3 km	MPC · JPL
173016	2006 PZ_{26}	—	August 15, 2006	Palomar	NEAT	·	3.5 km	MPC · JPL
173017	2006 PO_{27}	—	August 13, 2006	Siding Spring	SSS	MAR	1.9 km	MPC · JPL
173018	2006 PS_{27}	—	August 13, 2006	Siding Spring	SSS	EUP	6.8 km	MPC · JPL
173019	2006 PT_{29}	—	August 12, 2006	Palomar	NEAT	AEG	5.9 km	MPC · JPL
173020	2006 PF_{37}	—	August 12, 2006	Palomar	NEAT	EUN	2.1 km	MPC · JPL
173021	2006 QW_{1}	—	August 17, 2006	Palomar	NEAT	NYS	1.3 km	MPC · JPL
173022	2006 QU_{2}	—	August 17, 2006	Palomar	NEAT	·	1.8 km	MPC · JPL
173023	2006 QX_{3}	—	August 18, 2006	Kitt Peak	Spacewatch	HYG	5.0 km	MPC · JPL
173024	2006 QG_{7}	—	August 17, 2006	Palomar	NEAT	GEF	2.2 km	MPC · JPL
173025	2006 QA_{17}	—	August 17, 2006	Palomar	NEAT	·	2.2 km	MPC · JPL
173026	2006 QL_{18}	—	August 17, 2006	Palomar	NEAT	EOS	2.9 km	MPC · JPL
173027	2006 QO_{18}	—	August 17, 2006	Palomar	NEAT	·	2.0 km	MPC · JPL
173028	2006 QP_{18}	—	August 17, 2006	Palomar	NEAT	·	3.1 km	MPC · JPL
173029	2006 QQ_{19}	—	August 17, 2006	Palomar	NEAT	·	3.1 km	MPC · JPL
173030	2006 QE_{29}	—	August 21, 2006	Palomar	NEAT	·	1.1 km	MPC · JPL
173031	2006 QM_{29}	—	August 16, 2006	Siding Spring	SSS	·	3.0 km	MPC · JPL
173032 Mingus	2006 QF_{40}	Mingus	August 25, 2006	La Cañada	Lacruz, J.	·	4.2 km	MPC · JPL
173033	2006 QX_{44}	—	August 19, 2006	Kitt Peak	Spacewatch	VER	4.1 km	MPC · JPL
173034	2006 QG_{45}	—	August 19, 2006	Kitt Peak	Spacewatch	·	2.2 km	MPC · JPL
173035	2006 QL_{50}	—	August 22, 2006	Palomar	NEAT	·	2.1 km	MPC · JPL
173036	2006 QR_{51}	—	August 23, 2006	Palomar	NEAT	V	1.1 km	MPC · JPL
173037	2006 QK_{57}	—	August 25, 2006	RAS	Lowe, A.	·	5.0 km	MPC · JPL
173038	2006 QZ_{76}	—	August 21, 2006	Palomar	NEAT	KOR	2.2 km	MPC · JPL
173039	2006 QW_{80}	—	August 24, 2006	Palomar	NEAT	·	2.4 km	MPC · JPL
173040	2006 QV_{92}	—	August 16, 2006	Palomar	NEAT	·	4.6 km	MPC · JPL
173041	2006 QD_{96}	—	August 16, 2006	Palomar	NEAT	·	2.7 km	MPC · JPL
173042	2006 QU_{96}	—	August 16, 2006	Palomar	NEAT	·	2.4 km	MPC · JPL
173043	2006 QP_{104}	—	August 28, 2006	Anderson Mesa	LONEOS	·	4.3 km	MPC · JPL
173044	2006 QL_{107}	—	August 28, 2006	Catalina	CSS	HYG	3.3 km	MPC · JPL
173045	2006 QP_{114}	—	August 27, 2006	Anderson Mesa	LONEOS	·	6.7 km	MPC · JPL
173046	2006 QD_{116}	—	August 27, 2006	Anderson Mesa	LONEOS	·	5.5 km	MPC · JPL
173047	2006 QJ_{121}	—	August 29, 2006	Catalina	CSS	·	2.8 km	MPC · JPL
173048	2006 QQ_{128}	—	August 17, 2006	Palomar	NEAT	·	1.6 km	MPC · JPL
173049	2006 QH_{141}	—	August 18, 2006	Palomar	NEAT	·	3.5 km	MPC · JPL
173050	2006 QU_{142}	—	August 31, 2006	Vicques	M. Ory	EOS	3.9 km	MPC · JPL
173051	2006 QM_{168}	—	August 30, 2006	Anderson Mesa	LONEOS	·	2.2 km	MPC · JPL
173052	2006 QP_{170}	—	August 19, 2006	Kitt Peak	Spacewatch	KOR	2.2 km	MPC · JPL
173053	2006 RU_{9}	—	September 13, 2006	Palomar	NEAT	·	2.3 km	MPC · JPL
173054	2006 RR_{71}	—	September 15, 2006	Kitt Peak	Spacewatch	·	3.8 km	MPC · JPL
173055	2006 RT_{79}	—	September 15, 2006	Kitt Peak	Spacewatch	·	3.5 km	MPC · JPL
173056	2006 SP_{8}	—	September 16, 2006	Anderson Mesa	LONEOS	·	5.6 km	MPC · JPL
173057	2006 SD_{51}	—	September 17, 2006	Catalina	CSS	GEF	2.1 km	MPC · JPL
173058	2006 SY_{53}	—	September 16, 2006	Catalina	CSS	CYB	7.3 km	MPC · JPL
173059	2006 SE_{56}	—	September 19, 2006	Catalina	CSS	·	3.9 km	MPC · JPL
173060	2006 SA_{59}	—	September 16, 2006	Catalina	CSS	EUN	2.3 km	MPC · JPL
173061	2006 SQ_{59}	—	September 16, 2006	Catalina	CSS	·	5.0 km	MPC · JPL
173062	2006 SD_{86}	—	September 18, 2006	Kitt Peak	Spacewatch	THM	3.3 km	MPC · JPL
173063	2006 SG_{93}	—	September 18, 2006	Kitt Peak	Spacewatch	·	2.2 km	MPC · JPL
173064	2006 SD_{122}	—	September 19, 2006	Catalina	CSS	·	4.9 km	MPC · JPL
173065	2006 SZ_{123}	—	September 19, 2006	Catalina	CSS	·	3.0 km	MPC · JPL
173066	2006 SY_{127}	—	September 17, 2006	Catalina	CSS	·	6.4 km	MPC · JPL
173067	2006 SX_{148}	—	September 19, 2006	Kitt Peak	Spacewatch	·	2.4 km	MPC · JPL
173068	2006 SU_{171}	—	September 25, 2006	Kitt Peak	Spacewatch	KOR	2.3 km	MPC · JPL
173069	2006 SQ_{199}	—	September 24, 2006	Kitt Peak	Spacewatch	·	930 m	MPC · JPL
173070	2006 SW_{256}	—	September 26, 2006	Kitt Peak	Spacewatch	·	3.5 km	MPC · JPL
173071	2006 SM_{280}	—	September 29, 2006	Anderson Mesa	LONEOS	3:2	8.3 km	MPC · JPL
173072	2006 SG_{387}	—	September 30, 2006	Apache Point	A. C. Becker	·	3.0 km	MPC · JPL
173073	2006 TS_{49}	—	October 12, 2006	Palomar	NEAT	·	1.7 km	MPC · JPL
173074	2006 TU_{60}	—	October 14, 2006	Bergisch Gladbach	W. Bickel	·	2.4 km	MPC · JPL
173075	2006 UC	—	October 16, 2006	Wrightwood	J. W. Young	·	4.8 km	MPC · JPL
173076	2006 UV_{50}	—	October 17, 2006	Catalina	CSS	AGN	1.9 km	MPC · JPL
173077	2006 UH_{134}	—	October 19, 2006	Kitt Peak	Spacewatch	·	3.6 km	MPC · JPL
173078	2006 UM_{187}	—	October 19, 2006	Catalina	CSS	·	4.5 km	MPC · JPL
173079	2006 UY_{187}	—	October 19, 2006	Catalina	CSS	·	4.9 km	MPC · JPL
173080	2006 UN_{188}	—	October 19, 2006	Catalina	CSS	·	6.5 km	MPC · JPL
173081	2006 UD_{219}	—	October 16, 2006	Catalina	CSS	·	5.0 km	MPC · JPL
173082	2006 UT_{265}	—	October 27, 2006	Catalina	CSS	·	7.0 km	MPC · JPL
173083	2006 WG_{80}	—	November 18, 2006	Kitt Peak	Spacewatch	3:2 · SHU	7.8 km	MPC · JPL
173084	2007 PO_{1}	—	August 5, 2007	Črni Vrh	Skvarč, J.	L4	14 km	MPC · JPL
173085	2007 PY_{31}	—	August 8, 2007	Socorro	LINEAR	KOR	2.0 km	MPC · JPL
173086 Nireus	2007 RS_{8}	Nireus	September 8, 2007	Vicques	M. Ory	L4	16 km	MPC · JPL
173087	2007 RJ_{20}	—	September 2, 2007	Catalina	CSS	·	5.8 km	MPC · JPL
173088	2007 RS_{36}	—	September 8, 2007	Anderson Mesa	LONEOS	MAS	930 m	MPC · JPL
173089	2007 RJ_{37}	—	September 8, 2007	Anderson Mesa	LONEOS	·	890 m	MPC · JPL
173090	2007 RJ_{207}	—	September 10, 2007	Kitt Peak	Spacewatch	·	1.6 km	MPC · JPL
173091	2007 RU_{217}	—	September 13, 2007	Kitt Peak	Spacewatch	KOR	1.8 km	MPC · JPL
173092	2007 RP_{240}	—	September 14, 2007	Mount Lemmon	Mount Lemmon Survey	·	1.2 km	MPC · JPL
173093	2007 TH_{35}	—	October 7, 2007	Mount Lemmon	Mount Lemmon Survey	·	3.0 km	MPC · JPL
173094 Wielicki	2007 TM_{69}	Wielicki	October 14, 2007	Suno	V. S. Casulli	KOR	1.8 km	MPC · JPL
173095	2007 TV_{73}	—	October 13, 2007	RAS	Lowe, A.	·	1.3 km	MPC · JPL
173096	2007 TA_{79}	—	October 5, 2007	Kitt Peak	Spacewatch	·	2.9 km	MPC · JPL
173097	2007 TJ_{115}	—	October 8, 2007	Anderson Mesa	LONEOS	·	4.7 km	MPC · JPL
173098	2007 TO_{129}	—	October 6, 2007	Kitt Peak	Spacewatch	·	2.9 km	MPC · JPL
173099	2007 TR_{149}	—	October 8, 2007	Socorro	LINEAR	·	2.9 km	MPC · JPL
173100	2007 TF_{263}	—	October 10, 2007	Kitt Peak	Spacewatch	·	1.2 km	MPC · JPL

== 173101–173200 ==
back to top

Designation			Discovery			Properties		Ref
Permanent	Provisional	Named after	Date	Site	Discoverer(s)	Category	Diam.	Ref
173101	2007 TV_{320}	—	October 13, 2007	Catalina	CSS	·	3.0 km	MPC · JPL
173102	2007 TJ_{379}	—	October 13, 2007	Catalina	CSS	·	2.9 km	MPC · JPL
173103	2007 UF_{38}	—	October 19, 2007	Kitt Peak	Spacewatch	·	2.3 km	MPC · JPL
173104	2007 UY_{114}	—	October 31, 2007	Kitt Peak	Spacewatch	·	1.2 km	MPC · JPL
173105	2007 VU_{5}	—	November 4, 2007	7300 Observatory	W. K. Y. Yeung	NYS	1.3 km	MPC · JPL
173106	2007 VN_{79}	—	November 3, 2007	Kitt Peak	Spacewatch	NYS	1.6 km	MPC · JPL
173107	2007 VX_{111}	—	November 3, 2007	Kitt Peak	Spacewatch	KOR	1.9 km	MPC · JPL
173108 Ingola	6240 P-L	Ingola	September 24, 1960	Palomar	C. J. van Houten, I. van Houten-Groeneveld, T. Gehrels	T_{j} (2.96)	4.7 km	MPC · JPL
173109	7635 P-L	—	October 17, 1960	Palomar	C. J. van Houten, I. van Houten-Groeneveld, T. Gehrels	·	1.2 km	MPC · JPL
173110	2323 T-1	—	March 25, 1971	Palomar	C. J. van Houten, I. van Houten-Groeneveld, T. Gehrels	·	3.7 km	MPC · JPL
173111	2059 T-2	—	September 29, 1973	Palomar	C. J. van Houten, I. van Houten-Groeneveld, T. Gehrels	·	1.9 km	MPC · JPL
173112	4327 T-2	—	September 29, 1973	Palomar	C. J. van Houten, I. van Houten-Groeneveld, T. Gehrels	·	3.0 km	MPC · JPL
173113	5038 T-2	—	September 25, 1973	Palomar	C. J. van Houten, I. van Houten-Groeneveld, T. Gehrels	·	2.3 km	MPC · JPL
173114	1195 T-3	—	October 17, 1977	Palomar	C. J. van Houten, I. van Houten-Groeneveld, T. Gehrels	·	2.7 km	MPC · JPL
173115	3145 T-3	—	October 16, 1977	Palomar	C. J. van Houten, I. van Houten-Groeneveld, T. Gehrels	·	5.1 km	MPC · JPL
173116	4162 T-3	—	October 16, 1977	Palomar	C. J. van Houten, I. van Houten-Groeneveld, T. Gehrels	·	1.6 km	MPC · JPL
173117 Promachus	1973 SA_{1}	Promachus	September 24, 1973	Palomar	C. J. van Houten, I. van Houten-Groeneveld, T. Gehrels	L4	13 km	MPC · JPL
173118	1981 EB_{4}	—	March 2, 1981	Siding Spring	S. J. Bus	·	4.6 km	MPC · JPL
173119	1981 EU_{46}	—	March 2, 1981	Siding Spring	S. J. Bus	·	3.6 km	MPC · JPL
173120	1990 TL_{9}	—	October 10, 1990	Tautenburg Observatory	F. Börngen, L. D. Schmadel	·	2.3 km	MPC · JPL
173121	1991 VO_{10}	—	November 5, 1991	Kitt Peak	Spacewatch	·	2.0 km	MPC · JPL
173122	1992 BV_{4}	—	January 30, 1992	Kitt Peak	Spacewatch	·	3.1 km	MPC · JPL
173123	1993 FB_{35}	—	March 19, 1993	La Silla	UESAC	·	2.2 km	MPC · JPL
173124	1993 FX_{47}	—	March 19, 1993	La Silla	UESAC	·	2.5 km	MPC · JPL
173125	1993 PB_{2}	—	August 15, 1993	Kitt Peak	Spacewatch	·	1.2 km	MPC · JPL
173126	1994 AY_{8}	—	January 8, 1994	Kitt Peak	Spacewatch	·	2.6 km	MPC · JPL
173127	1994 CQ_{10}	—	February 7, 1994	La Silla	E. W. Elst	·	2.8 km	MPC · JPL
173128	1994 HL_{1}	—	April 19, 1994	Kitt Peak	Spacewatch	·	1.3 km	MPC · JPL
173129	1994 JH_{2}	—	May 1, 1994	Kitt Peak	Spacewatch	PHO	4.9 km	MPC · JPL
173130	1994 JA_{6}	—	May 4, 1994	Kitt Peak	Spacewatch	ERI	1.7 km	MPC · JPL
173131	1994 PY_{36}	—	August 10, 1994	La Silla	E. W. Elst	·	4.3 km	MPC · JPL
173132	1994 RY_{2}	—	September 2, 1994	Kitt Peak	Spacewatch	·	5.1 km	MPC · JPL
173133	1994 TS_{6}	—	October 4, 1994	Kitt Peak	Spacewatch	·	1.4 km	MPC · JPL
173134	1994 YP_{2}	—	December 27, 1994	Caussols	C. Pollas	H	870 m	MPC · JPL
173135	1995 FO_{7}	—	March 25, 1995	Kitt Peak	Spacewatch	NEM	3.1 km	MPC · JPL
173136	1995 HP_{1}	—	April 24, 1995	Kitt Peak	Spacewatch	·	3.8 km	MPC · JPL
173137	1995 HH_{3}	—	April 26, 1995	Kitt Peak	Spacewatch	·	3.6 km	MPC · JPL
173138	1995 QZ_{4}	—	August 22, 1995	Kitt Peak	Spacewatch	·	1.2 km	MPC · JPL
173139	1995 SO_{16}	—	September 18, 1995	Kitt Peak	Spacewatch	MAS	1.1 km	MPC · JPL
173140	1995 SH_{19}	—	September 18, 1995	Kitt Peak	Spacewatch	·	3.2 km	MPC · JPL
173141	1995 SQ_{44}	—	September 25, 1995	Kitt Peak	Spacewatch	MAS	1.4 km	MPC · JPL
173142	1995 SJ_{57}	—	September 21, 1995	Kitt Peak	Spacewatch	NYS	1.4 km	MPC · JPL
173143	1995 SY_{66}	—	September 17, 1995	Kitt Peak	Spacewatch	THM	2.2 km	MPC · JPL
173144	1995 TY_{2}	—	October 15, 1995	Kitt Peak	Spacewatch	·	1.5 km	MPC · JPL
173145	1995 TT_{3}	—	October 15, 1995	Kitt Peak	Spacewatch	·	3.1 km	MPC · JPL
173146	1995 UM	—	October 17, 1995	Sormano	P. Sicoli, Ghezzi, P.	V	1.3 km	MPC · JPL
173147	1995 UC_{38}	—	October 22, 1995	Kitt Peak	Spacewatch	·	1.9 km	MPC · JPL
173148	1995 VX_{3}	—	November 14, 1995	Kitt Peak	Spacewatch	·	5.2 km	MPC · JPL
173149	1995 VH_{18}	—	November 15, 1995	Kitt Peak	Spacewatch	NYS	1.5 km	MPC · JPL
173150	1995 WM_{12}	—	November 16, 1995	Kitt Peak	Spacewatch	·	3.2 km	MPC · JPL
173151	1995 WV_{24}	—	November 18, 1995	Kitt Peak	Spacewatch	V	980 m	MPC · JPL
173152	1995 XC_{4}	—	December 14, 1995	Kitt Peak	Spacewatch	·	5.3 km	MPC · JPL
173153	1996 EB_{12}	—	March 13, 1996	Kitt Peak	Spacewatch	·	2.7 km	MPC · JPL
173154	1996 ME	—	June 16, 1996	Kitt Peak	Spacewatch	·	1.3 km	MPC · JPL
173155	1996 RP	—	September 8, 1996	Prescott	P. G. Comba	·	4.0 km	MPC · JPL
173156	1996 RV_{9}	—	September 7, 1996	Kitt Peak	Spacewatch	·	1.1 km	MPC · JPL
173157	1996 RX_{12}	—	September 8, 1996	Kitt Peak	Spacewatch	·	1.1 km	MPC · JPL
173158	1996 TJ_{1}	—	October 6, 1996	Prescott	P. G. Comba	·	2.2 km	MPC · JPL
173159	1996 TS_{39}	—	October 8, 1996	La Silla	E. W. Elst	·	1.1 km	MPC · JPL
173160	1996 UD_{2}	—	October 17, 1996	Kitt Peak	Spacewatch	·	1.0 km	MPC · JPL
173161	1996 VN_{22}	—	November 9, 1996	Kitt Peak	Spacewatch	·	2.2 km	MPC · JPL
173162	1996 XP_{9}	—	December 1, 1996	Kitt Peak	Spacewatch	·	1.1 km	MPC · JPL
173163	1996 XP_{12}	—	December 6, 1996	Kitt Peak	Spacewatch	·	1.6 km	MPC · JPL
173164	1996 XZ_{18}	—	December 7, 1996	Oizumi	T. Kobayashi	NYS	1.8 km	MPC · JPL
173165	1997 AM_{18}	—	January 15, 1997	Kleť	Kleť	·	5.2 km	MPC · JPL
173166	1997 BP_{2}	—	January 30, 1997	Oizumi	T. Kobayashi	EUP	7.7 km	MPC · JPL
173167	1997 CS_{17}	—	February 3, 1997	Kitt Peak	Spacewatch	·	1.5 km	MPC · JPL
173168	1997 EB_{2}	—	March 4, 1997	Kitt Peak	Spacewatch	·	1.6 km	MPC · JPL
173169	1997 ED_{27}	—	March 5, 1997	Kitt Peak	Spacewatch	·	7.6 km	MPC · JPL
173170	1997 EU_{31}	—	March 10, 1997	Kitt Peak	Spacewatch	·	1.1 km	MPC · JPL
173171	1997 EE_{44}	—	March 11, 1997	Socorro	LINEAR	·	4.5 km	MPC · JPL
173172	1997 EN_{58}	—	March 10, 1997	La Silla	E. W. Elst	NYS	1.7 km	MPC · JPL
173173	1997 GX_{2}	—	April 7, 1997	Kitt Peak	Spacewatch	·	2.7 km	MPC · JPL
173174	1997 GO_{12}	—	April 3, 1997	Socorro	LINEAR	·	2.0 km	MPC · JPL
173175	1997 HL_{2}	—	April 29, 1997	Kitt Peak	Spacewatch	NYS	1.7 km	MPC · JPL
173176	1997 KO	—	May 29, 1997	Mount Hopkins	C. W. Hergenrother	·	1.9 km	MPC · JPL
173177	1997 SW_{4}	—	September 23, 1997	Modra	A. Galád, P. Kolény	·	1.2 km	MPC · JPL
173178	1997 TY_{10}	—	October 3, 1997	Kitt Peak	Spacewatch	·	2.1 km	MPC · JPL
173179	1997 TL_{24}	—	October 6, 1997	Xinglong	SCAP	·	1.1 km	MPC · JPL
173180	1997 UP_{17}	—	October 25, 1997	Kitt Peak	Spacewatch	·	2.7 km	MPC · JPL
173181	1998 FM	—	March 18, 1998	Kitt Peak	Spacewatch	·	3.0 km	MPC · JPL
173182	1998 FY	—	March 18, 1998	Kitt Peak	Spacewatch	·	1.1 km	MPC · JPL
173183	1998 FN_{51}	—	March 20, 1998	Socorro	LINEAR	·	1.2 km	MPC · JPL
173184	1998 FQ_{61}	—	March 20, 1998	Socorro	LINEAR	·	1.3 km	MPC · JPL
173185	1998 FB_{72}	—	March 20, 1998	Socorro	LINEAR	NYS	1.6 km	MPC · JPL
173186	1998 FT_{92}	—	March 24, 1998	Socorro	LINEAR	·	1.2 km	MPC · JPL
173187	1998 HU_{53}	—	April 21, 1998	Socorro	LINEAR	·	2.6 km	MPC · JPL
173188	1998 HV_{71}	—	April 21, 1998	Socorro	LINEAR	·	2.0 km	MPC · JPL
173189	1998 HE_{108}	—	April 23, 1998	Socorro	LINEAR	·	4.3 km	MPC · JPL
173190	1998 KC_{46}	—	May 22, 1998	Socorro	LINEAR	·	1.6 km	MPC · JPL
173191	1998 KJ_{61}	—	May 23, 1998	Socorro	LINEAR	·	1.5 km	MPC · JPL
173192	1998 NK_{1}	—	July 15, 1998	Kitt Peak	Spacewatch	·	2.1 km	MPC · JPL
173193	1998 QK_{3}	—	August 17, 1998	Socorro	LINEAR	·	2.4 km	MPC · JPL
173194	1998 QN_{15}	—	August 17, 1998	Socorro	LINEAR	·	4.0 km	MPC · JPL
173195	1998 QD_{33}	—	August 17, 1998	Socorro	LINEAR	(5)	1.5 km	MPC · JPL
173196	1998 QF_{33}	—	August 17, 1998	Socorro	LINEAR	(5)	1.7 km	MPC · JPL
173197	1998 QZ_{38}	—	August 17, 1998	Socorro	LINEAR	·	4.0 km	MPC · JPL
173198	1998 QW_{44}	—	August 17, 1998	Socorro	LINEAR	(5)	2.3 km	MPC · JPL
173199	1998 QQ_{86}	—	August 24, 1998	Socorro	LINEAR	·	2.7 km	MPC · JPL
173200	1998 QJ_{91}	—	August 28, 1998	Socorro	LINEAR	·	2.4 km	MPC · JPL

== 173201–173300 ==
back to top

Designation			Discovery			Properties		Ref
Permanent	Provisional	Named after	Date	Site	Discoverer(s)	Category	Diam.	Ref
173201	1998 RR_{6}	—	September 15, 1998	Anderson Mesa	LONEOS	EUN	2.0 km	MPC · JPL
173202	1998 RN_{51}	—	September 14, 1998	Socorro	LINEAR	(5)	2.2 km	MPC · JPL
173203	1998 RD_{64}	—	September 14, 1998	Socorro	LINEAR	·	1.8 km	MPC · JPL
173204	1998 RN_{66}	—	September 14, 1998	Socorro	LINEAR	EUN	2.4 km	MPC · JPL
173205	1998 RT_{67}	—	September 14, 1998	Socorro	LINEAR	·	3.8 km	MPC · JPL
173206	1998 SS_{14}	—	September 17, 1998	Anderson Mesa	LONEOS	·	3.5 km	MPC · JPL
173207	1998 ST_{20}	—	September 21, 1998	Kitt Peak	Spacewatch	(5)	1.7 km	MPC · JPL
173208	1998 SO_{26}	—	September 24, 1998	Kleť	Kleť	MAR	1.4 km	MPC · JPL
173209	1998 SP_{29}	—	September 18, 1998	Kitt Peak	Spacewatch	·	1.6 km	MPC · JPL
173210	1998 SM_{42}	—	September 28, 1998	Kitt Peak	Spacewatch	·	2.4 km	MPC · JPL
173211	1998 SE_{83}	—	September 26, 1998	Socorro	LINEAR	·	1.5 km	MPC · JPL
173212	1998 SX_{99}	—	September 26, 1998	Socorro	LINEAR	(5)	1.7 km	MPC · JPL
173213	1998 SB_{104}	—	September 26, 1998	Socorro	LINEAR	·	1.6 km	MPC · JPL
173214	1998 SR_{121}	—	September 26, 1998	Socorro	LINEAR	·	1.8 km	MPC · JPL
173215	1998 SG_{176}	—	September 25, 1998	Anderson Mesa	LONEOS	·	1.3 km	MPC · JPL
173216	1998 TY_{5}	—	October 15, 1998	Višnjan Observatory	K. Korlević	·	1.9 km	MPC · JPL
173217	1998 TS_{9}	—	October 12, 1998	Kitt Peak	Spacewatch	·	1.6 km	MPC · JPL
173218	1998 TP_{15}	—	October 15, 1998	Caussols	ODAS	EUN	2.3 km	MPC · JPL
173219	1998 TZ_{25}	—	October 14, 1998	Kitt Peak	Spacewatch	(5)	1.6 km	MPC · JPL
173220	1998 TN_{26}	—	October 14, 1998	Kitt Peak	Spacewatch	·	1.9 km	MPC · JPL
173221	1998 TL_{31}	—	October 11, 1998	Anderson Mesa	LONEOS	·	1.9 km	MPC · JPL
173222	1998 UQ_{8}	—	October 17, 1998	Xinglong	SCAP	·	2.2 km	MPC · JPL
173223	1998 UY_{14}	—	October 23, 1998	Kitt Peak	Spacewatch	·	2.5 km	MPC · JPL
173224	1998 UF_{17}	—	October 17, 1998	Xinglong	SCAP	·	2.0 km	MPC · JPL
173225	1998 VE_{1}	—	November 10, 1998	Socorro	LINEAR	·	3.5 km	MPC · JPL
173226	1998 VW_{14}	—	November 10, 1998	Socorro	LINEAR	CLO	3.8 km	MPC · JPL
173227	1998 VJ_{38}	—	November 10, 1998	Socorro	LINEAR	·	2.5 km	MPC · JPL
173228	1998 VM_{42}	—	November 15, 1998	Kitt Peak	Spacewatch	·	1.5 km	MPC · JPL
173229	1998 WH_{15}	—	November 21, 1998	Socorro	LINEAR	EUN	1.9 km	MPC · JPL
173230	1998 XM	—	December 6, 1998	San Marcello	A. Boattini, L. Tesi	·	2.0 km	MPC · JPL
173231	1998 XX	—	December 7, 1998	Caussols	ODAS	EUN	1.7 km	MPC · JPL
173232	1998 XC_{9}	—	December 12, 1998	Socorro	LINEAR	AMO +1km	780 m	MPC · JPL
173233	1998 YD_{17}	—	December 22, 1998	Kitt Peak	Spacewatch	·	3.9 km	MPC · JPL
173234	1999 AK_{11}	—	January 7, 1999	Kitt Peak	Spacewatch	WIT	1.4 km	MPC · JPL
173235	1999 BE_{15}	—	January 24, 1999	Višnjan Observatory	K. Korlević	·	3.2 km	MPC · JPL
173236	1999 BA_{27}	—	January 16, 1999	Kitt Peak	Spacewatch	(7744)	2.3 km	MPC · JPL
173237	1999 BD_{32}	—	January 19, 1999	Kitt Peak	Spacewatch	·	3.0 km	MPC · JPL
173238	1999 DW_{3}	—	February 21, 1999	Kitt Peak	Spacewatch	·	1.4 km	MPC · JPL
173239	1999 FJ_{61}	—	March 22, 1999	Anderson Mesa	LONEOS	DOR	3.8 km	MPC · JPL
173240	1999 GA_{11}	—	April 11, 1999	Kitt Peak	Spacewatch	·	770 m	MPC · JPL
173241	1999 HU_{3}	—	April 18, 1999	Catalina	CSS	·	2.9 km	MPC · JPL
173242	1999 JC_{10}	—	May 8, 1999	Catalina	CSS	·	1.3 km	MPC · JPL
173243	1999 JC_{90}	—	May 12, 1999	Socorro	LINEAR	·	1.2 km	MPC · JPL
173244	1999 KD	—	May 16, 1999	Kitt Peak	Spacewatch	·	1.8 km	MPC · JPL
173245	1999 LY_{7}	—	June 8, 1999	Socorro	LINEAR	·	1.2 km	MPC · JPL
173246	1999 MP	—	June 20, 1999	Reedy Creek	J. Broughton	·	4.0 km	MPC · JPL
173247	1999 RQ_{46}	—	September 7, 1999	Socorro	LINEAR	·	1.9 km	MPC · JPL
173248	1999 RA_{54}	—	September 7, 1999	Socorro	LINEAR	ERI	2.9 km	MPC · JPL
173249	1999 RV_{64}	—	September 7, 1999	Socorro	LINEAR	NYS	1.3 km	MPC · JPL
173250	1999 RV_{72}	—	September 7, 1999	Socorro	LINEAR	·	3.4 km	MPC · JPL
173251	1999 RD_{73}	—	September 7, 1999	Socorro	LINEAR	·	1.6 km	MPC · JPL
173252	1999 RT_{80}	—	September 7, 1999	Socorro	LINEAR	MAS	930 m	MPC · JPL
173253	1999 RQ_{93}	—	September 7, 1999	Socorro	LINEAR	NYS	2.0 km	MPC · JPL
173254	1999 RG_{97}	—	September 7, 1999	Socorro	LINEAR	NYS	1.7 km	MPC · JPL
173255	1999 RP_{106}	—	September 8, 1999	Socorro	LINEAR	V	1.1 km	MPC · JPL
173256	1999 RT_{114}	—	September 9, 1999	Socorro	LINEAR	·	1.9 km	MPC · JPL
173257	1999 RH_{120}	—	September 9, 1999	Socorro	LINEAR	NYS	1.2 km	MPC · JPL
173258	1999 RT_{136}	—	September 9, 1999	Socorro	LINEAR	·	1.6 km	MPC · JPL
173259	1999 RF_{137}	—	September 9, 1999	Socorro	LINEAR	NYS	1.5 km	MPC · JPL
173260	1999 RS_{141}	—	September 9, 1999	Socorro	LINEAR	·	2.0 km	MPC · JPL
173261	1999 RQ_{156}	—	September 9, 1999	Socorro	LINEAR	·	2.8 km	MPC · JPL
173262	1999 RD_{176}	—	September 15, 1999	Monte Agliale	Santangelo, M. M. M.	·	1.1 km	MPC · JPL
173263	1999 RT_{178}	—	September 9, 1999	Socorro	LINEAR	NYS	1.3 km	MPC · JPL
173264	1999 RD_{179}	—	September 9, 1999	Socorro	LINEAR	NYS	2.2 km	MPC · JPL
173265	1999 RG_{183}	—	September 9, 1999	Socorro	LINEAR	·	2.3 km	MPC · JPL
173266	1999 RY_{189}	—	September 9, 1999	Socorro	LINEAR	NYS	1.4 km	MPC · JPL
173267	1999 RG_{190}	—	September 10, 1999	Socorro	LINEAR	·	5.1 km	MPC · JPL
173268	1999 RY_{190}	—	September 10, 1999	Socorro	LINEAR	·	1.4 km	MPC · JPL
173269	1999 RC_{218}	—	September 4, 1999	Catalina	CSS	NYS	1.7 km	MPC · JPL
173270	1999 RO_{222}	—	September 7, 1999	Catalina	CSS	·	1.9 km	MPC · JPL
173271	1999 RW_{253}	—	September 7, 1999	Socorro	LINEAR	·	1.6 km	MPC · JPL
173272	1999 RG_{258}	—	September 3, 1999	Kitt Peak	Spacewatch	·	1.4 km	MPC · JPL
173273	1999 SZ_{4}	—	September 29, 1999	Socorro	LINEAR	·	3.5 km	MPC · JPL
173274	1999 SS_{7}	—	September 29, 1999	Socorro	LINEAR	·	1.7 km	MPC · JPL
173275	1999 TQ_{16}	—	October 14, 1999	Ondřejov	L. Kotková	MAR	1.9 km	MPC · JPL
173276	1999 TC_{40}	—	October 5, 1999	Catalina	CSS	NYS	1.6 km	MPC · JPL
173277	1999 TG_{47}	—	October 4, 1999	Kitt Peak	Spacewatch	·	1.1 km	MPC · JPL
173278	1999 TB_{54}	—	October 6, 1999	Kitt Peak	Spacewatch	·	1.4 km	MPC · JPL
173279	1999 TZ_{67}	—	October 8, 1999	Kitt Peak	Spacewatch	·	1.5 km	MPC · JPL
173280	1999 TN_{69}	—	October 9, 1999	Kitt Peak	Spacewatch	NYS	2.2 km	MPC · JPL
173281	1999 TY_{86}	—	October 15, 1999	Kitt Peak	Spacewatch	·	3.3 km	MPC · JPL
173282	1999 TC_{115}	—	October 4, 1999	Socorro	LINEAR	·	3.3 km	MPC · JPL
173283	1999 TE_{115}	—	October 4, 1999	Socorro	LINEAR	·	1.8 km	MPC · JPL
173284	1999 TG_{117}	—	October 4, 1999	Socorro	LINEAR	·	1.8 km	MPC · JPL
173285	1999 TL_{118}	—	October 4, 1999	Socorro	LINEAR	·	1.6 km	MPC · JPL
173286	1999 TT_{118}	—	October 4, 1999	Socorro	LINEAR	ERI	2.7 km	MPC · JPL
173287	1999 TF_{146}	—	October 7, 1999	Socorro	LINEAR	(5)	1.4 km	MPC · JPL
173288	1999 TH_{150}	—	October 7, 1999	Socorro	LINEAR	·	2.5 km	MPC · JPL
173289	1999 TC_{157}	—	October 9, 1999	Socorro	LINEAR	·	1.8 km	MPC · JPL
173290	1999 TD_{175}	—	October 10, 1999	Socorro	LINEAR	·	3.2 km	MPC · JPL
173291	1999 TT_{193}	—	October 12, 1999	Socorro	LINEAR	·	2.1 km	MPC · JPL
173292	1999 TG_{202}	—	October 13, 1999	Socorro	LINEAR	·	3.9 km	MPC · JPL
173293	1999 TZ_{220}	—	October 2, 1999	Anderson Mesa	LONEOS	·	1.4 km	MPC · JPL
173294	1999 TB_{223}	—	October 3, 1999	Catalina	CSS	·	2.1 km	MPC · JPL
173295	1999 TR_{229}	—	October 5, 1999	Catalina	CSS	MAS	1.3 km	MPC · JPL
173296	1999 TM_{262}	—	October 15, 1999	Anderson Mesa	LONEOS	·	1.3 km	MPC · JPL
173297	1999 TE_{276}	—	October 6, 1999	Socorro	LINEAR	V	1 km	MPC · JPL
173298	1999 TV_{289}	—	October 10, 1999	Socorro	LINEAR	MAS	1.0 km	MPC · JPL
173299	1999 TZ_{300}	—	October 3, 1999	Anderson Mesa	LONEOS	·	1.7 km	MPC · JPL
173300	1999 TJ_{312}	—	October 4, 1999	Kitt Peak	Spacewatch	NYS	1.4 km	MPC · JPL

== 173301–173400 ==
back to top

Designation			Discovery			Properties		Ref
Permanent	Provisional	Named after	Date	Site	Discoverer(s)	Category	Diam.	Ref
173301	1999 TN_{318}	—	October 12, 1999	Kitt Peak	Spacewatch	NYS	1.7 km	MPC · JPL
173302	1999 UH_{10}	—	October 31, 1999	Socorro	LINEAR	H	820 m	MPC · JPL
173303	1999 UH_{16}	—	October 29, 1999	Catalina	CSS	(5)	1.6 km	MPC · JPL
173304	1999 UM_{32}	—	October 31, 1999	Kitt Peak	Spacewatch	·	1.2 km	MPC · JPL
173305	1999 UC_{34}	—	October 31, 1999	Kitt Peak	Spacewatch	NYS	1.7 km	MPC · JPL
173306	1999 UY_{43}	—	October 29, 1999	Catalina	CSS	·	1.7 km	MPC · JPL
173307	1999 UK_{62}	—	October 31, 1999	Catalina	CSS	·	2.7 km	MPC · JPL
173308	1999 VO_{5}	—	November 6, 1999	Fountain Hills	C. W. Juels	·	2.9 km	MPC · JPL
173309	1999 VK_{22}	—	November 13, 1999	Fountain Hills	C. W. Juels	·	2.6 km	MPC · JPL
173310	1999 VU_{29}	—	November 3, 1999	Socorro	LINEAR	·	1.9 km	MPC · JPL
173311	1999 VJ_{39}	—	November 10, 1999	Socorro	LINEAR	·	2.7 km	MPC · JPL
173312	1999 VM_{39}	—	November 10, 1999	Socorro	LINEAR	MAS	1.3 km	MPC · JPL
173313	1999 VY_{39}	—	November 11, 1999	Kitt Peak	Spacewatch	·	2.4 km	MPC · JPL
173314	1999 VO_{44}	—	November 4, 1999	Catalina	CSS	·	2.1 km	MPC · JPL
173315	1999 VF_{51}	—	November 3, 1999	Socorro	LINEAR	·	2.0 km	MPC · JPL
173316	1999 VL_{51}	—	November 3, 1999	Socorro	LINEAR	V	1.1 km	MPC · JPL
173317	1999 VL_{56}	—	November 4, 1999	Socorro	LINEAR	NYS	2.3 km	MPC · JPL
173318	1999 VR_{56}	—	November 4, 1999	Socorro	LINEAR	·	2.2 km	MPC · JPL
173319	1999 VX_{69}	—	November 4, 1999	Socorro	LINEAR	·	1.8 km	MPC · JPL
173320	1999 VP_{94}	—	November 9, 1999	Socorro	LINEAR	·	1.9 km	MPC · JPL
173321	1999 VQ_{95}	—	November 9, 1999	Socorro	LINEAR	·	3.1 km	MPC · JPL
173322	1999 VC_{131}	—	November 9, 1999	Kitt Peak	Spacewatch	·	1.8 km	MPC · JPL
173323	1999 VD_{134}	—	November 10, 1999	Kitt Peak	Spacewatch	V	1.1 km	MPC · JPL
173324	1999 VT_{139}	—	November 10, 1999	Kitt Peak	Spacewatch	NYS	1.8 km	MPC · JPL
173325	1999 VZ_{141}	—	November 10, 1999	Kitt Peak	Spacewatch	NYS	1.8 km	MPC · JPL
173326	1999 VW_{146}	—	November 12, 1999	Socorro	LINEAR	·	2.1 km	MPC · JPL
173327	1999 VA_{165}	—	November 14, 1999	Socorro	LINEAR	NYS	1.7 km	MPC · JPL
173328	1999 VJ_{167}	—	November 14, 1999	Socorro	LINEAR	MAS	1.4 km	MPC · JPL
173329	1999 VF_{186}	—	November 15, 1999	Socorro	LINEAR	NYS	1.3 km	MPC · JPL
173330	1999 VA_{187}	—	November 15, 1999	Socorro	LINEAR	ADE	2.4 km	MPC · JPL
173331	1999 VS_{187}	—	November 15, 1999	Socorro	LINEAR	·	4.5 km	MPC · JPL
173332	1999 VQ_{209}	—	November 11, 1999	Catalina	CSS	·	2.1 km	MPC · JPL
173333	1999 VK_{217}	—	November 5, 1999	Kitt Peak	Spacewatch	·	1.3 km	MPC · JPL
173334	1999 WU_{11}	—	November 28, 1999	Kitt Peak	Spacewatch	·	1.8 km	MPC · JPL
173335	1999 WB_{14}	—	November 28, 1999	Kitt Peak	Spacewatch	·	1.8 km	MPC · JPL
173336	1999 WS_{14}	—	November 28, 1999	Kitt Peak	Spacewatch	·	1.7 km	MPC · JPL
173337	1999 XZ_{11}	—	December 6, 1999	Catalina	CSS	·	2.6 km	MPC · JPL
173338	1999 XY_{12}	—	December 5, 1999	Socorro	LINEAR	RAF	1.8 km	MPC · JPL
173339	1999 XL_{16}	—	December 7, 1999	Socorro	LINEAR	·	4.5 km	MPC · JPL
173340	1999 XY_{23}	—	December 6, 1999	Socorro	LINEAR	·	2.9 km	MPC · JPL
173341	1999 XL_{48}	—	December 7, 1999	Socorro	LINEAR	MAS	1.4 km	MPC · JPL
173342	1999 XW_{53}	—	December 7, 1999	Socorro	LINEAR	·	2.2 km	MPC · JPL
173343	1999 XU_{56}	—	December 7, 1999	Socorro	LINEAR	·	2.0 km	MPC · JPL
173344	1999 XB_{68}	—	December 7, 1999	Socorro	LINEAR	NYS	2.0 km	MPC · JPL
173345	1999 XE_{71}	—	December 7, 1999	Socorro	LINEAR	·	2.9 km	MPC · JPL
173346	1999 XB_{90}	—	December 7, 1999	Socorro	LINEAR	NYS	1.8 km	MPC · JPL
173347	1999 XC_{93}	—	December 7, 1999	Socorro	LINEAR	·	5.7 km	MPC · JPL
173348	1999 XQ_{134}	—	December 3, 1999	Socorro	LINEAR	PHO	2.9 km	MPC · JPL
173349	1999 XD_{141}	—	December 3, 1999	Kitt Peak	Spacewatch	·	2.3 km	MPC · JPL
173350	1999 XX_{154}	—	December 8, 1999	Socorro	LINEAR	NYS	2.6 km	MPC · JPL
173351	1999 XZ_{163}	—	December 8, 1999	Socorro	LINEAR	HIL · 3:2	11 km	MPC · JPL
173352	1999 XB_{182}	—	December 12, 1999	Socorro	LINEAR	RAF	1.5 km	MPC · JPL
173353	1999 XQ_{251}	—	December 9, 1999	Kitt Peak	Spacewatch	·	1.8 km	MPC · JPL
173354	1999 YD_{1}	—	December 17, 1999	Socorro	LINEAR	H	1.2 km	MPC · JPL
173355	1999 YP_{2}	—	December 16, 1999	Kitt Peak	Spacewatch	·	2.1 km	MPC · JPL
173356	1999 YK_{3}	—	December 17, 1999	Socorro	LINEAR	·	3.3 km	MPC · JPL
173357	1999 YG_{8}	—	December 27, 1999	Kitt Peak	Spacewatch	·	2.1 km	MPC · JPL
173358	1999 YL_{12}	—	December 27, 1999	Kitt Peak	Spacewatch	·	5.8 km	MPC · JPL
173359	2000 AQ	—	January 2, 2000	Kitt Peak	Spacewatch	·	2.2 km	MPC · JPL
173360	2000 AN_{1}	—	January 2, 2000	Socorro	LINEAR	H	840 m	MPC · JPL
173361	2000 AQ_{42}	—	January 4, 2000	Socorro	LINEAR	H	1.0 km	MPC · JPL
173362	2000 AW_{42}	—	January 4, 2000	Socorro	LINEAR	H	940 m	MPC · JPL
173363	2000 AD_{49}	—	January 5, 2000	Socorro	LINEAR	H	940 m	MPC · JPL
173364	2000 AT_{49}	—	January 5, 2000	Socorro	LINEAR	H	1.1 km	MPC · JPL
173365	2000 AD_{58}	—	January 4, 2000	Socorro	LINEAR	·	2.0 km	MPC · JPL
173366	2000 AU_{69}	—	January 5, 2000	Socorro	LINEAR	KON	5.0 km	MPC · JPL
173367	2000 AM_{82}	—	January 5, 2000	Socorro	LINEAR	·	1.5 km	MPC · JPL
173368	2000 AG_{93}	—	January 4, 2000	Socorro	LINEAR	H	950 m	MPC · JPL
173369	2000 AJ_{143}	—	January 5, 2000	Socorro	LINEAR	·	2.3 km	MPC · JPL
173370	2000 AX_{152}	—	January 8, 2000	Socorro	LINEAR	H	980 m	MPC · JPL
173371	2000 AH_{186}	—	January 8, 2000	Socorro	LINEAR	·	1.9 km	MPC · JPL
173372	2000 AM_{205}	—	January 15, 2000	Prescott	P. G. Comba	·	1.8 km	MPC · JPL
173373	2000 AC_{216}	—	January 7, 2000	Kitt Peak	Spacewatch	H	1.1 km	MPC · JPL
173374	2000 AS_{227}	—	January 10, 2000	Kitt Peak	Spacewatch	H	1.3 km	MPC · JPL
173375	2000 AV_{230}	—	January 3, 2000	Kitt Peak	Spacewatch	·	1.5 km	MPC · JPL
173376	2000 AO_{251}	—	January 5, 2000	Socorro	LINEAR	·	2.2 km	MPC · JPL
173377	2000 BZ	—	January 28, 2000	Socorro	LINEAR	H	930 m	MPC · JPL
173378	2000 BO_{2}	—	January 26, 2000	Socorro	LINEAR	H	810 m	MPC · JPL
173379	2000 BH_{9}	—	January 26, 2000	Kitt Peak	Spacewatch	·	1.9 km	MPC · JPL
173380	2000 BL_{9}	—	January 26, 2000	Kitt Peak	Spacewatch	·	1.4 km	MPC · JPL
173381	2000 BB_{13}	—	January 28, 2000	Kitt Peak	Spacewatch	·	1.9 km	MPC · JPL
173382	2000 BZ_{40}	—	January 30, 2000	Kitt Peak	Spacewatch	·	2.2 km	MPC · JPL
173383	2000 CR_{11}	—	February 2, 2000	Socorro	LINEAR	·	2.1 km	MPC · JPL
173384	2000 CW_{21}	—	February 2, 2000	Socorro	LINEAR	·	4.1 km	MPC · JPL
173385	2000 CU_{36}	—	February 2, 2000	Socorro	LINEAR	·	3.1 km	MPC · JPL
173386	2000 CF_{48}	—	February 2, 2000	Socorro	LINEAR	·	4.0 km	MPC · JPL
173387	2000 CG_{50}	—	February 2, 2000	Socorro	LINEAR	EUN	2.4 km	MPC · JPL
173388	2000 CT_{58}	—	February 2, 2000	Socorro	LINEAR	H	890 m	MPC · JPL
173389	2000 CW_{58}	—	February 6, 2000	Socorro	LINEAR	H	850 m	MPC · JPL
173390	2000 CA_{59}	—	February 6, 2000	Socorro	LINEAR	H	780 m	MPC · JPL
173391	2000 CF_{67}	—	February 6, 2000	Socorro	LINEAR	·	2.5 km	MPC · JPL
173392	2000 CU_{68}	—	February 1, 2000	Kitt Peak	Spacewatch	·	2.0 km	MPC · JPL
173393	2000 CP_{82}	—	February 4, 2000	Socorro	LINEAR	(5)	1.8 km	MPC · JPL
173394	2000 CP_{137}	—	February 4, 2000	Kitt Peak	Spacewatch	·	1.5 km	MPC · JPL
173395 Dweinberg	2000 CJ_{149}	Dweinberg	February 12, 2000	Apache Point	SDSS	WIT	1.5 km	MPC · JPL
173396	2000 DY_{9}	—	February 26, 2000	Kitt Peak	Spacewatch	·	1.6 km	MPC · JPL
173397	2000 DP_{18}	—	February 28, 2000	Socorro	LINEAR	·	2.0 km	MPC · JPL
173398	2000 DV_{20}	—	February 29, 2000	Socorro	LINEAR	·	1.7 km	MPC · JPL
173399	2000 DD_{24}	—	February 29, 2000	Socorro	LINEAR	(5)	2.1 km	MPC · JPL
173400	2000 DQ_{41}	—	February 29, 2000	Socorro	LINEAR	·	2.7 km	MPC · JPL

== 173401–173500 ==
back to top

Designation			Discovery			Properties		Ref
Permanent	Provisional	Named after	Date	Site	Discoverer(s)	Category	Diam.	Ref
173401	2000 DZ_{43}	—	February 29, 2000	Socorro	LINEAR	·	1.3 km	MPC · JPL
173402	2000 DR_{91}	—	February 27, 2000	Kitt Peak	Spacewatch	·	1.8 km	MPC · JPL
173403	2000 DM_{100}	—	February 29, 2000	Socorro	LINEAR	·	1.7 km	MPC · JPL
173404	2000 DA_{110}	—	February 29, 2000	Socorro	LINEAR	·	3.6 km	MPC · JPL
173405	2000 EQ_{11}	—	March 4, 2000	Socorro	LINEAR	EUN	1.9 km	MPC · JPL
173406	2000 EG_{16}	—	March 4, 2000	Kitt Peak	Spacewatch	·	2.9 km	MPC · JPL
173407	2000 EJ_{16}	—	March 3, 2000	Socorro	LINEAR	·	1.9 km	MPC · JPL
173408	2000 EN_{18}	—	March 5, 2000	Socorro	LINEAR	(5)	2.0 km	MPC · JPL
173409	2000 EV_{21}	—	March 5, 2000	Socorro	LINEAR	H	1.0 km	MPC · JPL
173410	2000 ET_{29}	—	March 5, 2000	Socorro	LINEAR	·	1.8 km	MPC · JPL
173411	2000 EY_{61}	—	March 10, 2000	Socorro	LINEAR	·	3.1 km	MPC · JPL
173412	2000 EP_{65}	—	March 10, 2000	Socorro	LINEAR	·	2.0 km	MPC · JPL
173413	2000 EM_{98}	—	March 9, 2000	Kitt Peak	Spacewatch	(5)	1.9 km	MPC · JPL
173414	2000 ED_{99}	—	March 12, 2000	Kitt Peak	Spacewatch	EUN	1.7 km	MPC · JPL
173415	2000 EA_{119}	—	March 11, 2000	Anderson Mesa	LONEOS	·	3.6 km	MPC · JPL
173416	2000 EU_{131}	—	March 11, 2000	Socorro	LINEAR	·	1.5 km	MPC · JPL
173417	2000 EB_{139}	—	March 11, 2000	Catalina	CSS	·	2.6 km	MPC · JPL
173418	2000 ER_{200}	—	March 1, 2000	Catalina	CSS	H	1.1 km	MPC · JPL
173419	2000 FX_{5}	—	March 25, 2000	Kitt Peak	Spacewatch	·	1.6 km	MPC · JPL
173420	2000 FV_{57}	—	March 26, 2000	Anderson Mesa	LONEOS	·	2.2 km	MPC · JPL
173421	2000 FL_{61}	—	March 29, 2000	Socorro	LINEAR	·	4.3 km	MPC · JPL
173422	2000 FP_{65}	—	March 27, 2000	Anderson Mesa	LONEOS	·	2.2 km	MPC · JPL
173423	2000 FE_{73}	—	March 26, 2000	Anderson Mesa	LONEOS	·	2.2 km	MPC · JPL
173424	2000 GV_{23}	—	April 5, 2000	Socorro	LINEAR	ADE	3.1 km	MPC · JPL
173425	2000 GG_{31}	—	April 5, 2000	Socorro	LINEAR	·	2.4 km	MPC · JPL
173426	2000 GY_{130}	—	April 7, 2000	Kitt Peak	Spacewatch	PAD	4.0 km	MPC · JPL
173427	2000 GD_{141}	—	April 6, 2000	Anderson Mesa	LONEOS	H	850 m	MPC · JPL
173428	2000 GR_{150}	—	April 5, 2000	Socorro	LINEAR	·	2.4 km	MPC · JPL
173429	2000 GZ_{152}	—	April 6, 2000	Anderson Mesa	LONEOS	·	2.6 km	MPC · JPL
173430	2000 GM_{154}	—	April 6, 2000	Anderson Mesa	LONEOS	·	1.7 km	MPC · JPL
173431	2000 GB_{163}	—	April 9, 2000	Anderson Mesa	LONEOS	EUN	2.1 km	MPC · JPL
173432	2000 GE_{178}	—	April 2, 2000	Anderson Mesa	LONEOS	·	1.9 km	MPC · JPL
173433	2000 HL_{1}	—	April 25, 2000	Kitt Peak	Spacewatch	·	2.0 km	MPC · JPL
173434	2000 HD_{43}	—	April 29, 2000	Socorro	LINEAR	MRX	1.7 km	MPC · JPL
173435	2000 HT_{43}	—	April 29, 2000	Kitt Peak	Spacewatch	(12739)	2.6 km	MPC · JPL
173436	2000 HQ_{72}	—	April 26, 2000	Anderson Mesa	LONEOS	·	2.6 km	MPC · JPL
173437	2000 JD_{42}	—	May 7, 2000	Socorro	LINEAR	MAR	1.8 km	MPC · JPL
173438	2000 JL_{68}	—	May 7, 2000	Kitt Peak	Spacewatch	·	2.4 km	MPC · JPL
173439	2000 KQ_{3}	—	May 27, 2000	Socorro	LINEAR	·	1.8 km	MPC · JPL
173440	2000 KD_{39}	—	May 24, 2000	Kitt Peak	Spacewatch	·	3.9 km	MPC · JPL
173441	2000 KY_{40}	—	May 30, 2000	Kitt Peak	Spacewatch	·	2.3 km	MPC · JPL
173442	2000 KC_{54}	—	May 27, 2000	Anderson Mesa	LONEOS	·	2.7 km	MPC · JPL
173443	2000 KE_{81}	—	May 26, 2000	Socorro	LINEAR	H	1.2 km	MPC · JPL
173444	2000 LG_{3}	—	June 5, 2000	Eskridge	G. Hug	·	2.3 km	MPC · JPL
173445	2000 NC_{18}	—	July 5, 2000	Anderson Mesa	LONEOS	·	5.2 km	MPC · JPL
173446	2000 OH_{9}	—	July 30, 2000	Prescott	P. G. Comba	·	7.8 km	MPC · JPL
173447	2000 PT_{2}	—	August 2, 2000	Socorro	LINEAR	·	1.2 km	MPC · JPL
173448	2000 PY_{23}	—	August 2, 2000	Socorro	LINEAR	·	5.2 km	MPC · JPL
173449	2000 QO_{6}	—	August 25, 2000	Emerald Lane	L. Ball	·	4.2 km	MPC · JPL
173450	2000 QG_{7}	—	August 25, 2000	Socorro	LINEAR	·	4.3 km	MPC · JPL
173451	2000 QN_{8}	—	August 25, 2000	Višnjan Observatory	K. Korlević, M. Jurić	·	4.8 km	MPC · JPL
173452	2000 QE_{14}	—	August 24, 2000	Socorro	LINEAR	·	940 m	MPC · JPL
173453	2000 QF_{16}	—	August 24, 2000	Socorro	LINEAR	·	5.1 km	MPC · JPL
173454	2000 QD_{20}	—	August 24, 2000	Socorro	LINEAR	·	1.3 km	MPC · JPL
173455	2000 QE_{41}	—	August 24, 2000	Socorro	LINEAR	·	4.3 km	MPC · JPL
173456	2000 QV_{41}	—	August 24, 2000	Socorro	LINEAR	·	4.0 km	MPC · JPL
173457	2000 QG_{45}	—	August 24, 2000	Socorro	LINEAR	·	1.2 km	MPC · JPL
173458	2000 QV_{82}	—	August 24, 2000	Socorro	LINEAR	·	1.4 km	MPC · JPL
173459	2000 QX_{88}	—	August 25, 2000	Socorro	LINEAR	·	1.1 km	MPC · JPL
173460	2000 QU_{92}	—	August 25, 2000	Socorro	LINEAR	·	980 m	MPC · JPL
173461	2000 QC_{96}	—	August 28, 2000	Socorro	LINEAR	·	1.3 km	MPC · JPL
173462	2000 QM_{107}	—	August 29, 2000	Socorro	LINEAR	THM	6.7 km	MPC · JPL
173463	2000 QH_{131}	—	August 24, 2000	Socorro	LINEAR	EOS	3.3 km	MPC · JPL
173464	2000 QX_{154}	—	August 31, 2000	Socorro	LINEAR	·	7.5 km	MPC · JPL
173465	2000 QX_{168}	—	August 31, 2000	Socorro	LINEAR	·	4.2 km	MPC · JPL
173466	2000 QJ_{169}	—	August 31, 2000	Socorro	LINEAR	·	1.1 km	MPC · JPL
173467	2000 QG_{194}	—	August 31, 2000	Socorro	LINEAR	·	5.7 km	MPC · JPL
173468	2000 QF_{210}	—	August 31, 2000	Socorro	LINEAR	·	4.4 km	MPC · JPL
173469	2000 RX_{27}	—	September 1, 2000	Socorro	LINEAR	·	960 m	MPC · JPL
173470	2000 RZ_{46}	—	September 3, 2000	Socorro	LINEAR	·	1.2 km	MPC · JPL
173471	2000 RX_{57}	—	September 7, 2000	Kitt Peak	Spacewatch	·	2.8 km	MPC · JPL
173472	2000 RS_{87}	—	September 2, 2000	Anderson Mesa	LONEOS	·	5.1 km	MPC · JPL
173473	2000 RD_{90}	—	September 3, 2000	Socorro	LINEAR	·	1.1 km	MPC · JPL
173474	2000 RH_{104}	—	September 6, 2000	Socorro	LINEAR	·	1.7 km	MPC · JPL
173475	2000 SA_{1}	—	September 18, 2000	Socorro	LINEAR	PHO	2.1 km	MPC · JPL
173476	2000 SZ_{27}	—	September 23, 2000	Socorro	LINEAR	·	970 m	MPC · JPL
173477	2000 SG_{35}	—	September 24, 2000	Socorro	LINEAR	THM	5.3 km	MPC · JPL
173478	2000 SE_{38}	—	September 24, 2000	Socorro	LINEAR	EOS	3.5 km	MPC · JPL
173479	2000 SB_{52}	—	September 23, 2000	Socorro	LINEAR	·	4.9 km	MPC · JPL
173480	2000 SQ_{67}	—	September 24, 2000	Socorro	LINEAR	·	4.7 km	MPC · JPL
173481	2000 SB_{73}	—	September 24, 2000	Socorro	LINEAR	·	1.3 km	MPC · JPL
173482	2000 ST_{84}	—	September 24, 2000	Socorro	LINEAR	THM	4.1 km	MPC · JPL
173483	2000 SD_{86}	—	September 24, 2000	Socorro	LINEAR	·	1.1 km	MPC · JPL
173484	2000 SW_{91}	—	September 23, 2000	Socorro	LINEAR	·	4.6 km	MPC · JPL
173485	2000 SG_{109}	—	September 24, 2000	Socorro	LINEAR	·	2.1 km	MPC · JPL
173486	2000 SK_{133}	—	September 23, 2000	Socorro	LINEAR	·	1.4 km	MPC · JPL
173487	2000 SR_{134}	—	September 23, 2000	Socorro	LINEAR	·	4.9 km	MPC · JPL
173488	2000 SO_{139}	—	September 23, 2000	Socorro	LINEAR	·	5.1 km	MPC · JPL
173489	2000 SE_{173}	—	September 28, 2000	Socorro	LINEAR	·	7.0 km	MPC · JPL
173490	2000 SP_{176}	—	September 28, 2000	Socorro	LINEAR	·	1.3 km	MPC · JPL
173491	2000 SY_{185}	—	September 21, 2000	Kitt Peak	Spacewatch	·	1.1 km	MPC · JPL
173492	2000 SZ_{187}	—	September 21, 2000	Haleakala	NEAT	·	1.2 km	MPC · JPL
173493	2000 SW_{208}	—	September 25, 2000	Socorro	LINEAR	·	4.7 km	MPC · JPL
173494	2000 SG_{250}	—	September 24, 2000	Socorro	LINEAR	·	4.3 km	MPC · JPL
173495	2000 SW_{272}	—	September 28, 2000	Socorro	LINEAR	·	1.1 km	MPC · JPL
173496	2000 SO_{284}	—	September 23, 2000	Socorro	LINEAR	·	1.0 km	MPC · JPL
173497	2000 SQ_{301}	—	September 28, 2000	Socorro	LINEAR	·	920 m	MPC · JPL
173498	2000 SH_{308}	—	September 30, 2000	Socorro	LINEAR	·	7.9 km	MPC · JPL
173499	2000 SU_{309}	—	September 25, 2000	Socorro	LINEAR	slow	8.0 km	MPC · JPL
173500	2000 SL_{311}	—	September 26, 2000	Socorro	LINEAR	EUP	6.7 km	MPC · JPL

== 173501–173600 ==
back to top

Designation			Discovery			Properties		Ref
Permanent	Provisional	Named after	Date	Site	Discoverer(s)	Category	Diam.	Ref
173501	2000 SU_{311}	—	September 27, 2000	Socorro	LINEAR	·	6.0 km	MPC · JPL
173502	2000 ST_{356}	—	September 28, 2000	Anderson Mesa	LONEOS	·	1.1 km	MPC · JPL
173503	2000 TQ_{53}	—	October 1, 2000	Socorro	LINEAR	·	4.4 km	MPC · JPL
173504	2000 TG_{55}	—	October 1, 2000	Socorro	LINEAR	EOS	5.8 km	MPC · JPL
173505	2000 UH_{7}	—	October 24, 2000	Socorro	LINEAR	·	1.9 km	MPC · JPL
173506	2000 UW_{22}	—	October 24, 2000	Socorro	LINEAR	·	1.1 km	MPC · JPL
173507	2000 UC_{42}	—	October 24, 2000	Socorro	LINEAR	·	1.5 km	MPC · JPL
173508	2000 UU_{43}	—	October 24, 2000	Socorro	LINEAR	·	1.3 km	MPC · JPL
173509	2000 UK_{50}	—	October 24, 2000	Socorro	LINEAR	·	2.0 km	MPC · JPL
173510	2000 UL_{59}	—	October 25, 2000	Socorro	LINEAR	·	840 m	MPC · JPL
173511	2000 UE_{63}	—	October 25, 2000	Socorro	LINEAR	·	2.4 km	MPC · JPL
173512	2000 UM_{63}	—	October 25, 2000	Socorro	LINEAR	·	1.2 km	MPC · JPL
173513	2000 UR_{65}	—	October 25, 2000	Socorro	LINEAR	·	6.1 km	MPC · JPL
173514	2000 UY_{71}	—	October 25, 2000	Socorro	LINEAR	·	1.3 km	MPC · JPL
173515	2000 UY_{79}	—	October 24, 2000	Socorro	LINEAR	·	1.3 km	MPC · JPL
173516	2000 UE_{84}	—	October 31, 2000	Socorro	LINEAR	·	900 m	MPC · JPL
173517	2000 UH_{105}	—	October 29, 2000	Socorro	LINEAR	·	1.4 km	MPC · JPL
173518	2000 UN_{107}	—	October 30, 2000	Socorro	LINEAR	·	1.2 km	MPC · JPL
173519	2000 VW_{8}	—	November 1, 2000	Socorro	LINEAR	·	1.2 km	MPC · JPL
173520	2000 VZ_{14}	—	November 1, 2000	Socorro	LINEAR	·	1.3 km	MPC · JPL
173521	2000 VY_{27}	—	November 1, 2000	Socorro	LINEAR	·	2.5 km	MPC · JPL
173522	2000 VK_{43}	—	November 1, 2000	Socorro	LINEAR	·	1.2 km	MPC · JPL
173523	2000 VG_{48}	—	November 2, 2000	Socorro	LINEAR	·	1.1 km	MPC · JPL
173524	2000 VX_{51}	—	November 3, 2000	Socorro	LINEAR	·	6.2 km	MPC · JPL
173525	2000 VF_{53}	—	November 3, 2000	Socorro	LINEAR	·	1.3 km	MPC · JPL
173526	2000 VX_{55}	—	November 3, 2000	Socorro	LINEAR	·	1.5 km	MPC · JPL
173527	2000 VO_{60}	—	November 1, 2000	Desert Beaver	W. K. Y. Yeung	·	1.3 km	MPC · JPL
173528	2000 WV_{1}	—	November 17, 2000	Kitt Peak	Spacewatch	·	970 m	MPC · JPL
173529	2000 WY_{3}	—	November 19, 2000	Socorro	LINEAR	·	9.5 km	MPC · JPL
173530	2000 WF_{13}	—	November 21, 2000	Socorro	LINEAR	·	1.2 km	MPC · JPL
173531	2000 WB_{29}	—	November 20, 2000	Socorro	LINEAR	·	3.1 km	MPC · JPL
173532	2000 WW_{35}	—	November 20, 2000	Socorro	LINEAR	·	1.4 km	MPC · JPL
173533	2000 WX_{42}	—	November 21, 2000	Socorro	LINEAR	·	1.3 km	MPC · JPL
173534	2000 WY_{71}	—	November 19, 2000	Socorro	LINEAR	·	1.1 km	MPC · JPL
173535	2000 WF_{76}	—	November 20, 2000	Socorro	LINEAR	·	1.0 km	MPC · JPL
173536	2000 WX_{77}	—	November 20, 2000	Socorro	LINEAR	·	1.2 km	MPC · JPL
173537	2000 WJ_{108}	—	November 20, 2000	Socorro	LINEAR	·	1.2 km	MPC · JPL
173538	2000 WY_{116}	—	November 20, 2000	Socorro	LINEAR	·	1.4 km	MPC · JPL
173539	2000 WD_{130}	—	November 19, 2000	Kitt Peak	Spacewatch	·	1.3 km	MPC · JPL
173540	2000 WG_{132}	—	November 18, 2000	Socorro	LINEAR	PHO	2.3 km	MPC · JPL
173541	2000 WS_{133}	—	November 19, 2000	Socorro	LINEAR	·	1.3 km	MPC · JPL
173542	2000 WT_{163}	—	November 21, 2000	Socorro	LINEAR	MAS	1.2 km	MPC · JPL
173543	2000 WP_{173}	—	November 25, 2000	Haleakala	NEAT	T_{j} (2.97) · 3:2	6.7 km	MPC · JPL
173544	2000 WC_{179}	—	November 25, 2000	Socorro	LINEAR	·	3.1 km	MPC · JPL
173545	2000 WF_{179}	—	November 26, 2000	Socorro	LINEAR	·	1.4 km	MPC · JPL
173546	2000 XZ_{18}	—	December 4, 2000	Socorro	LINEAR	·	1.5 km	MPC · JPL
173547	2000 XC_{28}	—	December 4, 2000	Socorro	LINEAR	·	1.4 km	MPC · JPL
173548	2000 XH_{31}	—	December 4, 2000	Socorro	LINEAR	·	1.4 km	MPC · JPL
173549	2000 XF_{47}	—	December 15, 2000	Socorro	LINEAR	·	1.8 km	MPC · JPL
173550	2000 XJ_{52}	—	December 6, 2000	Socorro	LINEAR	V	1.0 km	MPC · JPL
173551	2000 YH_{17}	—	December 27, 2000	Oaxaca	Roe, J. M.	·	1.3 km	MPC · JPL
173552	2000 YF_{51}	—	December 30, 2000	Socorro	LINEAR	·	1.2 km	MPC · JPL
173553	2000 YY_{89}	—	December 30, 2000	Socorro	LINEAR	·	1 km	MPC · JPL
173554	2000 YG_{92}	—	December 30, 2000	Socorro	LINEAR	·	1.2 km	MPC · JPL
173555	2000 YY_{107}	—	December 30, 2000	Socorro	LINEAR	·	1.3 km	MPC · JPL
173556	2000 YV_{125}	—	December 29, 2000	Anderson Mesa	LONEOS	·	1.8 km	MPC · JPL
173557	2000 YU_{127}	—	December 29, 2000	Haleakala	NEAT	·	1.6 km	MPC · JPL
173558	2000 YG_{128}	—	December 29, 2000	Haleakala	NEAT	V	1.1 km	MPC · JPL
173559	2000 YV_{128}	—	December 29, 2000	Haleakala	NEAT	·	1.5 km	MPC · JPL
173560	2000 YA_{129}	—	December 29, 2000	Haleakala	NEAT	·	2.3 km	MPC · JPL
173561	2000 YV_{137}	—	December 31, 2000	Haleakala	NEAT	APO · PHA	760 m	MPC · JPL
173562	2001 AE_{4}	—	January 2, 2001	Socorro	LINEAR	·	1.3 km	MPC · JPL
173563	2001 AG_{12}	—	January 2, 2001	Socorro	LINEAR	·	2.3 km	MPC · JPL
173564	2001 AD_{22}	—	January 3, 2001	Socorro	LINEAR	·	2.4 km	MPC · JPL
173565	2001 AN_{27}	—	January 5, 2001	Socorro	LINEAR	·	1.5 km	MPC · JPL
173566	2001 AA_{40}	—	January 3, 2001	Anderson Mesa	LONEOS	·	1.2 km	MPC · JPL
173567	2001 BY_{9}	—	January 16, 2001	Kitt Peak	Spacewatch	·	1.5 km	MPC · JPL
173568	2001 BH_{13}	—	January 21, 2001	Socorro	LINEAR	·	1.1 km	MPC · JPL
173569	2001 BL_{20}	—	January 19, 2001	Socorro	LINEAR	·	1.3 km	MPC · JPL
173570	2001 BP_{23}	—	January 20, 2001	Socorro	LINEAR	(2076)	1.2 km	MPC · JPL
173571	2001 BU_{29}	—	January 20, 2001	Socorro	LINEAR	·	1.3 km	MPC · JPL
173572	2001 BC_{34}	—	January 20, 2001	Socorro	LINEAR	·	2.3 km	MPC · JPL
173573	2001 BA_{35}	—	January 20, 2001	Socorro	LINEAR	·	1.4 km	MPC · JPL
173574	2001 BP_{35}	—	January 19, 2001	Kitt Peak	Spacewatch	·	1.1 km	MPC · JPL
173575	2001 BS_{50}	—	January 27, 2001	Ondřejov	P. Pravec, P. Kušnirák	·	2.1 km	MPC · JPL
173576	2001 BR_{55}	—	January 19, 2001	Socorro	LINEAR	·	3.4 km	MPC · JPL
173577	2001 BB_{64}	—	January 29, 2001	Socorro	LINEAR	NYS	2.6 km	MPC · JPL
173578	2001 BJ_{68}	—	January 31, 2001	Socorro	LINEAR	·	1.4 km	MPC · JPL
173579	2001 BT_{73}	—	January 29, 2001	Kvistaberg	Uppsala-DLR Asteroid Survey	NYS	2.0 km	MPC · JPL
173580	2001 CD_{1}	—	February 1, 2001	Socorro	LINEAR	·	2.6 km	MPC · JPL
173581	2001 CB_{7}	—	February 1, 2001	Socorro	LINEAR	V	1.1 km	MPC · JPL
173582	2001 CG_{9}	—	February 1, 2001	Socorro	LINEAR	·	2.9 km	MPC · JPL
173583	2001 CG_{10}	—	February 1, 2001	Socorro	LINEAR	V	1.2 km	MPC · JPL
173584	2001 CD_{11}	—	February 1, 2001	Socorro	LINEAR	·	1.6 km	MPC · JPL
173585	2001 CC_{14}	—	February 1, 2001	Socorro	LINEAR	·	1.5 km	MPC · JPL
173586	2001 CS_{22}	—	February 1, 2001	Anderson Mesa	LONEOS	·	1.1 km	MPC · JPL
173587	2001 CA_{24}	—	February 1, 2001	Anderson Mesa	LONEOS	·	1.2 km	MPC · JPL
173588	2001 DK_{9}	—	February 16, 2001	Socorro	LINEAR	·	1.6 km	MPC · JPL
173589	2001 DE_{11}	—	February 17, 2001	Socorro	LINEAR	·	1.2 km	MPC · JPL
173590	2001 DU_{11}	—	February 17, 2001	Socorro	LINEAR	·	2.1 km	MPC · JPL
173591	2001 DH_{24}	—	February 17, 2001	Socorro	LINEAR	·	1.8 km	MPC · JPL
173592	2001 DQ_{26}	—	February 17, 2001	Socorro	LINEAR	·	1.6 km	MPC · JPL
173593	2001 DK_{30}	—	February 17, 2001	Socorro	LINEAR	·	1.9 km	MPC · JPL
173594	2001 DA_{33}	—	February 17, 2001	Socorro	LINEAR	·	2.0 km	MPC · JPL
173595	2001 DL_{44}	—	February 19, 2001	Socorro	LINEAR	·	3.4 km	MPC · JPL
173596	2001 DC_{48}	—	February 19, 2001	Prescott	P. G. Comba	·	1.4 km	MPC · JPL
173597	2001 DD_{50}	—	February 16, 2001	Socorro	LINEAR	·	1.4 km	MPC · JPL
173598	2001 DW_{50}	—	February 16, 2001	Socorro	LINEAR	·	1.8 km	MPC · JPL
173599	2001 DF_{53}	—	February 19, 2001	Socorro	LINEAR	·	1.1 km	MPC · JPL
173600	2001 DJ_{57}	—	February 16, 2001	Kitt Peak	Spacewatch	·	1.8 km	MPC · JPL

== 173601–173700 ==
back to top

Designation			Discovery			Properties		Ref
Permanent	Provisional	Named after	Date	Site	Discoverer(s)	Category	Diam.	Ref
173601	2001 DJ_{59}	—	February 17, 2001	Socorro	LINEAR	·	1.5 km	MPC · JPL
173602	2001 DC_{66}	—	February 19, 2001	Socorro	LINEAR	NYS	2.0 km	MPC · JPL
173603	2001 DF_{76}	—	February 20, 2001	Socorro	LINEAR	·	1.1 km	MPC · JPL
173604	2001 DS_{101}	—	February 16, 2001	Socorro	LINEAR	·	2.0 km	MPC · JPL
173605	2001 EM_{5}	—	March 2, 2001	Anderson Mesa	LONEOS	NYS	1.9 km	MPC · JPL
173606	2001 EU_{8}	—	March 2, 2001	Anderson Mesa	LONEOS	·	1.5 km	MPC · JPL
173607	2001 ER_{11}	—	March 2, 2001	Haleakala	NEAT	·	2.5 km	MPC · JPL
173608	2001 EP_{12}	—	March 13, 2001	Socorro	LINEAR	·	1.9 km	MPC · JPL
173609	2001 EC_{21}	—	March 15, 2001	Anderson Mesa	LONEOS	V	1.1 km	MPC · JPL
173610	2001 FL_{3}	—	March 18, 2001	Socorro	LINEAR	·	1.5 km	MPC · JPL
173611	2001 FJ_{9}	—	March 19, 2001	Socorro	LINEAR	·	1.2 km	MPC · JPL
173612	2001 FV_{10}	—	March 19, 2001	Anderson Mesa	LONEOS	·	2.6 km	MPC · JPL
173613	2001 FR_{17}	—	March 19, 2001	Anderson Mesa	LONEOS	·	2.0 km	MPC · JPL
173614	2001 FN_{24}	—	March 17, 2001	Socorro	LINEAR	PHO	2.4 km	MPC · JPL
173615	2001 FK_{27}	—	March 18, 2001	Socorro	LINEAR	·	3.2 km	MPC · JPL
173616	2001 FO_{27}	—	March 18, 2001	Socorro	LINEAR	·	1.8 km	MPC · JPL
173617	2001 FX_{35}	—	March 18, 2001	Socorro	LINEAR	·	2.7 km	MPC · JPL
173618	2001 FL_{38}	—	March 18, 2001	Socorro	LINEAR	·	1.8 km	MPC · JPL
173619	2001 FR_{41}	—	March 18, 2001	Socorro	LINEAR	·	1.5 km	MPC · JPL
173620	2001 FE_{42}	—	March 18, 2001	Socorro	LINEAR	NYS	1.9 km	MPC · JPL
173621	2001 FU_{48}	—	March 18, 2001	Socorro	LINEAR	·	1.3 km	MPC · JPL
173622	2001 FT_{49}	—	March 18, 2001	Socorro	LINEAR	·	1.6 km	MPC · JPL
173623	2001 FY_{51}	—	March 18, 2001	Socorro	LINEAR	·	2.1 km	MPC · JPL
173624	2001 FA_{53}	—	March 18, 2001	Socorro	LINEAR	·	1.1 km	MPC · JPL
173625	2001 FJ_{57}	—	March 21, 2001	Haleakala	NEAT	NYS	2.0 km	MPC · JPL
173626	2001 FQ_{62}	—	March 19, 2001	Socorro	LINEAR	NYS	1.9 km	MPC · JPL
173627	2001 FC_{66}	—	March 19, 2001	Socorro	LINEAR	MAS	1.2 km	MPC · JPL
173628	2001 FF_{66}	—	March 19, 2001	Socorro	LINEAR	NYS	1.8 km	MPC · JPL
173629	2001 FC_{69}	—	March 19, 2001	Socorro	LINEAR	·	2.1 km	MPC · JPL
173630	2001 FK_{72}	—	March 19, 2001	Socorro	LINEAR	·	2.9 km	MPC · JPL
173631	2001 FH_{87}	—	March 21, 2001	Anderson Mesa	LONEOS	PHO	1.4 km	MPC · JPL
173632	2001 FT_{87}	—	March 21, 2001	Anderson Mesa	LONEOS	·	1.7 km	MPC · JPL
173633	2001 FM_{92}	—	March 16, 2001	Socorro	LINEAR	ERI	2.7 km	MPC · JPL
173634	2001 FB_{106}	—	March 18, 2001	Anderson Mesa	LONEOS	·	2.2 km	MPC · JPL
173635	2001 FQ_{106}	—	March 18, 2001	Socorro	LINEAR	·	1.5 km	MPC · JPL
173636	2001 FV_{107}	—	March 18, 2001	Anderson Mesa	LONEOS	·	1.8 km	MPC · JPL
173637	2001 FS_{122}	—	March 23, 2001	Anderson Mesa	LONEOS	NYS	1.9 km	MPC · JPL
173638	2001 FQ_{125}	—	March 24, 2001	Kitt Peak	Spacewatch	·	1.6 km	MPC · JPL
173639	2001 FH_{133}	—	March 20, 2001	Haleakala	NEAT	·	2.1 km	MPC · JPL
173640	2001 FK_{140}	—	March 21, 2001	Haleakala	NEAT	·	1.6 km	MPC · JPL
173641	2001 FE_{142}	—	March 23, 2001	Anderson Mesa	LONEOS	NYS	1.2 km	MPC · JPL
173642	2001 FK_{150}	—	March 24, 2001	Anderson Mesa	LONEOS	·	2.1 km	MPC · JPL
173643	2001 FG_{154}	—	March 22, 2001	Cima Ekar	Cima Ekar	3:2 · SHU	9.4 km	MPC · JPL
173644	2001 FC_{161}	—	March 29, 2001	Haleakala	NEAT	·	3.0 km	MPC · JPL
173645	2001 FX_{163}	—	March 18, 2001	Anderson Mesa	LONEOS	PHO	3.3 km	MPC · JPL
173646	2001 FM_{170}	—	March 24, 2001	Socorro	LINEAR	·	1.9 km	MPC · JPL
173647	2001 FD_{171}	—	March 24, 2001	Haleakala	NEAT	·	2.6 km	MPC · JPL
173648	2001 FS_{171}	—	March 24, 2001	Haleakala	NEAT	PHO	1.3 km	MPC · JPL
173649 Jeffreymoore	2001 FS_{184}	Jeffreymoore	March 26, 2001	Kitt Peak	M. W. Buie	·	1.8 km	MPC · JPL
173650	2001 FO_{186}	—	March 18, 2001	Anderson Mesa	LONEOS	·	1.8 km	MPC · JPL
173651	2001 FZ_{186}	—	March 18, 2001	Haleakala	NEAT	V	1.2 km	MPC · JPL
173652	2001 FN_{193}	—	March 18, 2001	Anderson Mesa	LONEOS	V	1.2 km	MPC · JPL
173653	2001 GY_{2}	—	April 14, 2001	Socorro	LINEAR	PHO	1.8 km	MPC · JPL
173654	2001 HC_{2}	—	April 17, 2001	Socorro	LINEAR	·	2.4 km	MPC · JPL
173655	2001 HX_{12}	—	April 18, 2001	Socorro	LINEAR	NYS	2.5 km	MPC · JPL
173656	2001 HD_{13}	—	April 18, 2001	Socorro	LINEAR	MAS	1.3 km	MPC · JPL
173657	2001 HN_{14}	—	April 21, 2001	Kitt Peak	Spacewatch	CLA	2.3 km	MPC · JPL
173658	2001 HX_{26}	—	April 27, 2001	Desert Beaver	W. K. Y. Yeung	·	2.2 km	MPC · JPL
173659	2001 HC_{38}	—	April 27, 2001	Desert Beaver	W. K. Y. Yeung	·	2.3 km	MPC · JPL
173660	2001 HD_{53}	—	April 23, 2001	Socorro	LINEAR	·	2.0 km	MPC · JPL
173661	2001 HR_{61}	—	April 24, 2001	Haleakala	NEAT	·	1.8 km	MPC · JPL
173662	2001 HT_{63}	—	April 26, 2001	Anderson Mesa	LONEOS	NYS	2.1 km	MPC · JPL
173663	2001 HW_{63}	—	April 27, 2001	Socorro	LINEAR	MAS	1.2 km	MPC · JPL
173664	2001 JU_{2}	—	May 15, 2001	Anderson Mesa	LONEOS	AMO	400 m	MPC · JPL
173665	2001 KM_{3}	—	May 17, 2001	Socorro	LINEAR	NYS	1.8 km	MPC · JPL
173666	2001 KN_{3}	—	May 17, 2001	Socorro	LINEAR	NYS	2.2 km	MPC · JPL
173667	2001 KZ_{14}	—	May 18, 2001	Socorro	LINEAR	NYS	2.3 km	MPC · JPL
173668	2001 KU_{38}	—	May 22, 2001	Socorro	LINEAR	·	4.0 km	MPC · JPL
173669	2001 KU_{52}	—	May 18, 2001	Anderson Mesa	LONEOS	·	2.2 km	MPC · JPL
173670	2001 LR_{17}	—	June 15, 2001	Socorro	LINEAR	EUN	1.8 km	MPC · JPL
173671	2001 MV_{15}	—	June 27, 2001	Palomar	NEAT	·	2.9 km	MPC · JPL
173672	2001 NY_{8}	—	July 12, 2001	Palomar	NEAT	·	2.0 km	MPC · JPL
173673	2001 NQ_{17}	—	July 14, 2001	Haleakala	NEAT	·	6.0 km	MPC · JPL
173674	2001 OC_{2}	—	July 18, 2001	Palomar	NEAT	·	2.9 km	MPC · JPL
173675	2001 OZ_{7}	—	July 17, 2001	Anderson Mesa	LONEOS	·	5.6 km	MPC · JPL
173676	2001 OQ_{11}	—	July 18, 2001	Palomar	NEAT	·	3.5 km	MPC · JPL
173677	2001 OV_{18}	—	July 17, 2001	Haleakala	NEAT	H	880 m	MPC · JPL
173678	2001 OM_{29}	—	July 18, 2001	Palomar	NEAT	fast	4.6 km	MPC · JPL
173679	2001 OH_{39}	—	July 20, 2001	Palomar	NEAT	·	5.3 km	MPC · JPL
173680	2001 OZ_{45}	—	July 16, 2001	Anderson Mesa	LONEOS	(13314)	3.3 km	MPC · JPL
173681	2001 OU_{50}	—	July 20, 2001	Palomar	NEAT	DOR	2.7 km	MPC · JPL
173682	2001 OX_{61}	—	July 21, 2001	Haleakala	NEAT	·	2.1 km	MPC · JPL
173683	2001 OB_{63}	—	July 27, 2001	Anderson Mesa	LONEOS	·	2.5 km	MPC · JPL
173684	2001 OP_{100}	—	July 27, 2001	Anderson Mesa	LONEOS	slow	2.9 km	MPC · JPL
173685	2001 OP_{106}	—	July 29, 2001	Socorro	LINEAR	·	3.1 km	MPC · JPL
173686	2001 OP_{110}	—	July 25, 2001	Haleakala	NEAT	EUN	2.0 km	MPC · JPL
173687	2001 OY_{112}	—	July 26, 2001	Haleakala	NEAT	·	3.5 km	MPC · JPL
173688	2001 PM_{5}	—	August 10, 2001	Palomar	NEAT	·	2.0 km	MPC · JPL
173689	2001 PK_{9}	—	August 10, 2001	Palomar	NEAT	AMO +1km	720 m	MPC · JPL
173690	2001 PL_{16}	—	August 9, 2001	Palomar	NEAT	·	2.8 km	MPC · JPL
173691	2001 PM_{19}	—	August 10, 2001	Palomar	NEAT	EUN	2.2 km	MPC · JPL
173692	2001 PS_{20}	—	August 10, 2001	Palomar	NEAT	GEF	2.3 km	MPC · JPL
173693	2001 PY_{37}	—	August 11, 2001	Palomar	NEAT	·	4.1 km	MPC · JPL
173694	2001 PS_{38}	—	August 11, 2001	Palomar	NEAT	·	3.3 km	MPC · JPL
173695	2001 PB_{65}	—	August 8, 2001	Haleakala	NEAT	HNS	2.8 km	MPC · JPL
173696	2001 QN	—	August 16, 2001	Socorro	LINEAR	H	940 m	MPC · JPL
173697	2001 QL_{5}	—	August 16, 2001	Socorro	LINEAR	·	4.9 km	MPC · JPL
173698	2001 QR_{16}	—	August 16, 2001	Socorro	LINEAR	·	1.8 km	MPC · JPL
173699	2001 QR_{34}	—	August 16, 2001	Socorro	LINEAR	·	3.5 km	MPC · JPL
173700	2001 QC_{36}	—	August 16, 2001	Socorro	LINEAR	·	2.7 km	MPC · JPL

== 173701–173800 ==
back to top

Designation			Discovery			Properties		Ref
Permanent	Provisional	Named after	Date	Site	Discoverer(s)	Category	Diam.	Ref
173701	2001 QC_{43}	—	August 16, 2001	Socorro	LINEAR	(18466)	3.5 km	MPC · JPL
173702	2001 QN_{46}	—	August 16, 2001	Socorro	LINEAR	·	4.7 km	MPC · JPL
173703	2001 QY_{50}	—	August 16, 2001	Socorro	LINEAR	T_{j} (2.99)	4.7 km	MPC · JPL
173704	2001 QG_{51}	—	August 16, 2001	Socorro	LINEAR	·	2.4 km	MPC · JPL
173705	2001 QB_{61}	—	August 19, 2001	Socorro	LINEAR	H	1.2 km	MPC · JPL
173706	2001 QQ_{66}	—	August 17, 2001	Socorro	LINEAR	ADE	4.4 km	MPC · JPL
173707	2001 QL_{94}	—	August 23, 2001	Desert Eagle	W. K. Y. Yeung	AGN	1.9 km	MPC · JPL
173708	2001 QS_{94}	—	August 23, 2001	Desert Eagle	W. K. Y. Yeung	·	3.5 km	MPC · JPL
173709	2001 QU_{106}	—	August 22, 2001	Socorro	LINEAR	T_{j} (2.99)	8.3 km	MPC · JPL
173710	2001 QU_{121}	—	August 19, 2001	Socorro	LINEAR	·	3.2 km	MPC · JPL
173711	2001 QR_{124}	—	August 19, 2001	Socorro	LINEAR	·	3.4 km	MPC · JPL
173712	2001 QD_{130}	—	August 20, 2001	Socorro	LINEAR	·	7.1 km	MPC · JPL
173713	2001 QC_{135}	—	August 22, 2001	Socorro	LINEAR	·	3.8 km	MPC · JPL
173714	2001 QR_{139}	—	August 22, 2001	Socorro	LINEAR	·	6.8 km	MPC · JPL
173715	2001 QD_{144}	—	August 21, 2001	Kitt Peak	Spacewatch	KOR	1.4 km	MPC · JPL
173716	2001 QY_{148}	—	August 21, 2001	Haleakala	NEAT	·	2.3 km	MPC · JPL
173717	2001 QC_{152}	—	August 26, 2001	Socorro	LINEAR	·	7.1 km	MPC · JPL
173718	2001 QA_{153}	—	August 27, 2001	Ondřejov	P. Kušnirák	·	2.3 km	MPC · JPL
173719	2001 QX_{177}	—	August 26, 2001	Haleakala	NEAT	·	3.6 km	MPC · JPL
173720	2001 QZ_{182}	—	August 23, 2001	Palomar	NEAT	·	5.9 km	MPC · JPL
173721	2001 QM_{188}	—	August 22, 2001	Kitt Peak	Spacewatch	AGN	3.3 km	MPC · JPL
173722	2001 QK_{193}	—	August 22, 2001	Socorro	LINEAR	TIR	4.3 km	MPC · JPL
173723	2001 QE_{195}	—	August 22, 2001	Socorro	LINEAR	·	4.5 km	MPC · JPL
173724	2001 QQ_{200}	—	August 22, 2001	Palomar	NEAT	·	3.0 km	MPC · JPL
173725	2001 QE_{204}	—	August 23, 2001	Anderson Mesa	LONEOS	·	2.4 km	MPC · JPL
173726	2001 QJ_{209}	—	August 23, 2001	Anderson Mesa	LONEOS	NAE	4.6 km	MPC · JPL
173727	2001 QS_{210}	—	August 23, 2001	Anderson Mesa	LONEOS	·	3.7 km	MPC · JPL
173728	2001 QP_{213}	—	August 23, 2001	Anderson Mesa	LONEOS	·	3.0 km	MPC · JPL
173729	2001 QU_{216}	—	August 23, 2001	Anderson Mesa	LONEOS	AGN	2.1 km	MPC · JPL
173730	2001 QW_{218}	—	August 23, 2001	Anderson Mesa	LONEOS	·	2.7 km	MPC · JPL
173731	2001 QK_{223}	—	August 24, 2001	Anderson Mesa	LONEOS	·	2.6 km	MPC · JPL
173732	2001 QV_{224}	—	August 24, 2001	Socorro	LINEAR	EUN	2.1 km	MPC · JPL
173733	2001 QH_{238}	—	August 24, 2001	Socorro	LINEAR	·	4.6 km	MPC · JPL
173734	2001 QT_{241}	—	August 24, 2001	Socorro	LINEAR	·	3.6 km	MPC · JPL
173735	2001 QT_{270}	—	August 19, 2001	Socorro	LINEAR	HNS	2.0 km	MPC · JPL
173736	2001 QJ_{273}	—	August 19, 2001	Socorro	LINEAR	·	2.7 km	MPC · JPL
173737	2001 QM_{274}	—	August 19, 2001	Socorro	LINEAR	·	3.0 km	MPC · JPL
173738	2001 QJ_{278}	—	August 19, 2001	Socorro	LINEAR	·	3.5 km	MPC · JPL
173739	2001 QZ_{286}	—	August 17, 2001	Socorro	LINEAR	·	3.3 km	MPC · JPL
173740	2001 QX_{287}	—	August 17, 2001	Socorro	LINEAR	·	3.8 km	MPC · JPL
173741	2001 QL_{295}	—	August 24, 2001	Socorro	LINEAR	·	5.0 km	MPC · JPL
173742	2001 QJ_{328}	—	August 26, 2001	Palomar	NEAT	·	6.2 km	MPC · JPL
173743	2001 QS_{328}	—	August 29, 2001	Palomar	NEAT	·	5.0 km	MPC · JPL
173744	2001 RP_{21}	—	September 7, 2001	Socorro	LINEAR	·	3.3 km	MPC · JPL
173745	2001 RD_{24}	—	September 7, 2001	Socorro	LINEAR	·	4.6 km	MPC · JPL
173746	2001 RH_{24}	—	September 7, 2001	Socorro	LINEAR	·	2.7 km	MPC · JPL
173747	2001 RL_{30}	—	September 7, 2001	Socorro	LINEAR	·	3.4 km	MPC · JPL
173748	2001 RW_{30}	—	September 7, 2001	Socorro	LINEAR	·	3.2 km	MPC · JPL
173749	2001 RC_{36}	—	September 8, 2001	Socorro	LINEAR	·	3.7 km	MPC · JPL
173750	2001 RB_{43}	—	September 7, 2001	Palomar	NEAT	·	2.4 km	MPC · JPL
173751	2001 RE_{46}	—	September 12, 2001	Goodricke-Pigott	R. A. Tucker	HOF	4.8 km	MPC · JPL
173752	2001 RB_{51}	—	September 11, 2001	Socorro	LINEAR	RAF	1.7 km	MPC · JPL
173753	2001 RJ_{82}	—	September 11, 2001	Anderson Mesa	LONEOS	MAR	2.0 km	MPC · JPL
173754	2001 RQ_{96}	—	September 12, 2001	Kitt Peak	Spacewatch	·	6.6 km	MPC · JPL
173755	2001 RW_{97}	—	September 12, 2001	Kitt Peak	Spacewatch	·	4.0 km	MPC · JPL
173756	2001 RM_{100}	—	September 12, 2001	Socorro	LINEAR	EOS	2.9 km	MPC · JPL
173757	2001 RE_{104}	—	September 12, 2001	Socorro	LINEAR	GEF	2.3 km	MPC · JPL
173758	2001 RF_{105}	—	September 12, 2001	Socorro	LINEAR	615	2.0 km	MPC · JPL
173759	2001 RG_{106}	—	September 12, 2001	Socorro	LINEAR	·	3.0 km	MPC · JPL
173760	2001 RG_{113}	—	September 12, 2001	Socorro	LINEAR	AST	3.4 km	MPC · JPL
173761	2001 RD_{117}	—	September 12, 2001	Socorro	LINEAR	·	2.7 km	MPC · JPL
173762	2001 RC_{121}	—	September 12, 2001	Socorro	LINEAR	·	3.0 km	MPC · JPL
173763	2001 RY_{122}	—	September 12, 2001	Socorro	LINEAR	KOR	2.2 km	MPC · JPL
173764	2001 RF_{123}	—	September 12, 2001	Socorro	LINEAR	·	3.2 km	MPC · JPL
173765	2001 RA_{135}	—	September 12, 2001	Socorro	LINEAR	·	4.7 km	MPC · JPL
173766	2001 RV_{137}	—	September 12, 2001	Socorro	LINEAR	EUN	2.1 km	MPC · JPL
173767	2001 RC_{138}	—	September 12, 2001	Socorro	LINEAR	EOS	2.9 km	MPC · JPL
173768	2001 RB_{143}	—	September 15, 2001	Palomar	NEAT	EOS	3.4 km	MPC · JPL
173769	2001 RC_{143}	—	September 15, 2001	Palomar	NEAT	·	2.9 km	MPC · JPL
173770	2001 RQ_{149}	—	September 11, 2001	Anderson Mesa	LONEOS	AGN	2.0 km	MPC · JPL
173771	2001 RF_{152}	—	September 11, 2001	Anderson Mesa	LONEOS	·	5.5 km	MPC · JPL
173772	2001 RW_{152}	—	September 11, 2001	Socorro	LINEAR	·	5.9 km	MPC · JPL
173773	2001 RF_{154}	—	September 15, 2001	Palomar	NEAT	EOS	3.0 km	MPC · JPL
173774	2001 SY_{11}	—	September 16, 2001	Socorro	LINEAR	HOF	5.1 km	MPC · JPL
173775	2001 SZ_{15}	—	September 16, 2001	Socorro	LINEAR	KOR	2.2 km	MPC · JPL
173776	2001 SE_{19}	—	September 16, 2001	Socorro	LINEAR	·	2.9 km	MPC · JPL
173777	2001 SF_{19}	—	September 16, 2001	Socorro	LINEAR	KOR	2.3 km	MPC · JPL
173778	2001 SK_{22}	—	September 16, 2001	Socorro	LINEAR	DOR	3.9 km	MPC · JPL
173779	2001 SC_{32}	—	September 16, 2001	Socorro	LINEAR	·	3.4 km	MPC · JPL
173780	2001 SV_{32}	—	September 16, 2001	Socorro	LINEAR	·	3.4 km	MPC · JPL
173781	2001 SB_{61}	—	September 17, 2001	Socorro	LINEAR	·	3.7 km	MPC · JPL
173782	2001 SZ_{76}	—	September 16, 2001	Socorro	LINEAR	(16286)	2.9 km	MPC · JPL
173783	2001 SL_{77}	—	September 17, 2001	Socorro	LINEAR	·	3.6 km	MPC · JPL
173784	2001 SO_{77}	—	September 17, 2001	Socorro	LINEAR	EOS	3.2 km	MPC · JPL
173785	2001 SQ_{82}	—	September 20, 2001	Socorro	LINEAR	PAD	4.6 km	MPC · JPL
173786	2001 SC_{84}	—	September 20, 2001	Socorro	LINEAR	HOF	4.4 km	MPC · JPL
173787	2001 SF_{85}	—	September 20, 2001	Socorro	LINEAR	·	3.4 km	MPC · JPL
173788	2001 SR_{90}	—	September 20, 2001	Socorro	LINEAR	EUN	2.0 km	MPC · JPL
173789	2001 SM_{98}	—	September 20, 2001	Socorro	LINEAR	DOR	4.2 km	MPC · JPL
173790	2001 SO_{113}	—	September 20, 2001	Desert Eagle	W. K. Y. Yeung	·	3.0 km	MPC · JPL
173791	2001 SS_{122}	—	September 16, 2001	Socorro	LINEAR	·	5.3 km	MPC · JPL
173792	2001 SY_{133}	—	September 16, 2001	Socorro	LINEAR	·	4.2 km	MPC · JPL
173793	2001 SB_{135}	—	September 16, 2001	Socorro	LINEAR	·	4.0 km	MPC · JPL
173794	2001 SB_{138}	—	September 16, 2001	Socorro	LINEAR	·	2.2 km	MPC · JPL
173795	2001 SH_{141}	—	September 16, 2001	Socorro	LINEAR	·	3.5 km	MPC · JPL
173796	2001 SD_{160}	—	September 17, 2001	Socorro	LINEAR	EOS	3.2 km	MPC · JPL
173797	2001 SO_{166}	—	September 19, 2001	Socorro	LINEAR	·	4.1 km	MPC · JPL
173798	2001 SA_{191}	—	September 19, 2001	Socorro	LINEAR	·	2.6 km	MPC · JPL
173799	2001 SF_{202}	—	September 19, 2001	Socorro	LINEAR	KOR	2.1 km	MPC · JPL
173800	2001 SS_{218}	—	September 19, 2001	Socorro	LINEAR	·	3.0 km	MPC · JPL

== 173801–173900 ==
back to top

Designation			Discovery			Properties		Ref
Permanent	Provisional	Named after	Date	Site	Discoverer(s)	Category	Diam.	Ref
173801	2001 SE_{225}	—	September 19, 2001	Socorro	LINEAR	KOR	1.8 km	MPC · JPL
173802	2001 SN_{228}	—	September 19, 2001	Socorro	LINEAR	NAE	5.4 km	MPC · JPL
173803	2001 SO_{229}	—	September 19, 2001	Socorro	LINEAR	·	3.3 km	MPC · JPL
173804	2001 SM_{233}	—	September 19, 2001	Socorro	LINEAR	KOR	2.1 km	MPC · JPL
173805	2001 SO_{233}	—	September 19, 2001	Socorro	LINEAR	·	3.1 km	MPC · JPL
173806	2001 SO_{237}	—	September 19, 2001	Socorro	LINEAR	KOR	1.8 km	MPC · JPL
173807	2001 SG_{238}	—	September 19, 2001	Socorro	LINEAR	KOR	1.9 km	MPC · JPL
173808	2001 SH_{239}	—	September 19, 2001	Socorro	LINEAR	·	3.2 km	MPC · JPL
173809	2001 SJ_{241}	—	September 19, 2001	Socorro	LINEAR	·	2.8 km	MPC · JPL
173810	2001 SW_{256}	—	September 19, 2001	Socorro	LINEAR	KOR	2.2 km	MPC · JPL
173811	2001 SQ_{270}	—	September 16, 2001	Palomar	NEAT	·	3.9 km	MPC · JPL
173812	2001 SO_{277}	—	September 21, 2001	Anderson Mesa	LONEOS	·	7.0 km	MPC · JPL
173813	2001 SP_{283}	—	September 20, 2001	Kitt Peak	Spacewatch	HOF	3.5 km	MPC · JPL
173814	2001 SR_{292}	—	September 16, 2001	Socorro	LINEAR	·	4.2 km	MPC · JPL
173815	2001 SG_{298}	—	September 20, 2001	Socorro	LINEAR	KOR	2.0 km	MPC · JPL
173816	2001 SV_{301}	—	September 20, 2001	Socorro	LINEAR	·	5.3 km	MPC · JPL
173817	2001 SU_{305}	—	September 20, 2001	Socorro	LINEAR	MRX	1.8 km	MPC · JPL
173818	2001 SR_{315}	—	September 25, 2001	Socorro	LINEAR	·	6.9 km	MPC · JPL
173819	2001 SD_{324}	—	September 26, 2001	Socorro	LINEAR	·	4.8 km	MPC · JPL
173820	2001 SJ_{328}	—	September 19, 2001	Socorro	LINEAR	·	3.1 km	MPC · JPL
173821	2001 SY_{334}	—	September 20, 2001	Socorro	LINEAR	·	4.4 km	MPC · JPL
173822	2001 SJ_{335}	—	September 20, 2001	Socorro	LINEAR	·	3.7 km	MPC · JPL
173823	2001 SO_{342}	—	September 21, 2001	Kitt Peak	Spacewatch	·	2.6 km	MPC · JPL
173824	2001 SU_{344}	—	September 23, 2001	Palomar	NEAT	TIR	5.0 km	MPC · JPL
173825	2001 SL_{345}	—	September 23, 2001	Haleakala	NEAT	·	5.2 km	MPC · JPL
173826	2001 SX_{348}	—	September 22, 2001	Palomar	NEAT	·	4.6 km	MPC · JPL
173827	2001 TT_{17}	—	October 14, 2001	Desert Eagle	W. K. Y. Yeung	·	7.4 km	MPC · JPL
173828	2001 TX_{21}	—	October 11, 2001	Socorro	LINEAR	·	2.8 km	MPC · JPL
173829	2001 TJ_{34}	—	October 14, 2001	Socorro	LINEAR	·	5.0 km	MPC · JPL
173830	2001 TO_{60}	—	October 13, 2001	Socorro	LINEAR	·	4.5 km	MPC · JPL
173831	2001 TV_{64}	—	October 13, 2001	Socorro	LINEAR	·	3.3 km	MPC · JPL
173832	2001 TO_{81}	—	October 14, 2001	Socorro	LINEAR	·	4.3 km	MPC · JPL
173833	2001 TW_{82}	—	October 14, 2001	Socorro	LINEAR	·	3.0 km	MPC · JPL
173834	2001 TE_{87}	—	October 14, 2001	Socorro	LINEAR	·	3.9 km	MPC · JPL
173835	2001 TC_{91}	—	October 14, 2001	Socorro	LINEAR	·	5.5 km	MPC · JPL
173836	2001 TV_{91}	—	October 14, 2001	Socorro	LINEAR	·	3.6 km	MPC · JPL
173837	2001 TP_{96}	—	October 14, 2001	Socorro	LINEAR	·	4.4 km	MPC · JPL
173838	2001 TD_{100}	—	October 14, 2001	Socorro	LINEAR	CYB	7.7 km	MPC · JPL
173839	2001 TH_{100}	—	October 14, 2001	Socorro	LINEAR	·	3.7 km	MPC · JPL
173840	2001 TS_{100}	—	October 14, 2001	Socorro	LINEAR	NEM	3.5 km	MPC · JPL
173841	2001 TU_{108}	—	October 14, 2001	Socorro	LINEAR	·	3.6 km	MPC · JPL
173842	2001 TM_{118}	—	October 15, 2001	Socorro	LINEAR	TIR	4.2 km	MPC · JPL
173843	2001 TN_{118}	—	October 15, 2001	Socorro	LINEAR	·	3.2 km	MPC · JPL
173844	2001 TK_{119}	—	October 15, 2001	Socorro	LINEAR	·	5.5 km	MPC · JPL
173845	2001 TP_{123}	—	October 12, 2001	Haleakala	NEAT	EOS	3.5 km	MPC · JPL
173846	2001 TX_{125}	—	October 12, 2001	Haleakala	NEAT	615	2.9 km	MPC · JPL
173847	2001 TA_{134}	—	October 12, 2001	Haleakala	NEAT	·	5.7 km	MPC · JPL
173848	2001 TC_{134}	—	October 12, 2001	Haleakala	NEAT	·	4.3 km	MPC · JPL
173849	2001 TY_{139}	—	October 10, 2001	Palomar	NEAT	TRE	4.7 km	MPC · JPL
173850	2001 TK_{140}	—	October 10, 2001	Palomar	NEAT	·	4.8 km	MPC · JPL
173851	2001 TK_{143}	—	October 10, 2001	Palomar	NEAT	·	4.6 km	MPC · JPL
173852	2001 TC_{150}	—	October 10, 2001	Palomar	NEAT	EOS	2.5 km	MPC · JPL
173853	2001 TY_{154}	—	October 15, 2001	Palomar	NEAT	·	4.8 km	MPC · JPL
173854	2001 TM_{157}	—	October 14, 2001	Kitt Peak	Spacewatch	KOR	1.8 km	MPC · JPL
173855	2001 TO_{169}	—	October 15, 2001	Socorro	LINEAR	EOS	2.9 km	MPC · JPL
173856	2001 TZ_{170}	—	October 15, 2001	Haleakala	NEAT	·	3.1 km	MPC · JPL
173857	2001 TH_{172}	—	October 13, 2001	Socorro	LINEAR	KOR	1.9 km	MPC · JPL
173858	2001 TA_{175}	—	October 15, 2001	Socorro	LINEAR	·	2.8 km	MPC · JPL
173859	2001 TL_{182}	—	October 14, 2001	Socorro	LINEAR	·	4.0 km	MPC · JPL
173860	2001 TP_{182}	—	October 14, 2001	Socorro	LINEAR	·	4.2 km	MPC · JPL
173861	2001 TF_{194}	—	October 15, 2001	Socorro	LINEAR	VER	6.3 km	MPC · JPL
173862	2001 TB_{196}	—	October 12, 2001	Haleakala	NEAT	·	4.6 km	MPC · JPL
173863	2001 TR_{204}	—	October 11, 2001	Socorro	LINEAR	·	3.1 km	MPC · JPL
173864	2001 TA_{206}	—	October 11, 2001	Socorro	LINEAR	·	6.6 km	MPC · JPL
173865	2001 TS_{206}	—	October 11, 2001	Socorro	LINEAR	·	5.0 km	MPC · JPL
173866	2001 TY_{206}	—	October 11, 2001	Socorro	LINEAR	(21885)	5.1 km	MPC · JPL
173867	2001 TE_{211}	—	October 13, 2001	Palomar	NEAT	·	4.6 km	MPC · JPL
173868	2001 TM_{212}	—	October 13, 2001	Anderson Mesa	LONEOS	·	3.7 km	MPC · JPL
173869	2001 TV_{216}	—	October 13, 2001	Palomar	NEAT	EOS	3.0 km	MPC · JPL
173870	2001 TZ_{220}	—	October 14, 2001	Socorro	LINEAR	·	5.9 km	MPC · JPL
173871	2001 TW_{235}	—	October 15, 2001	Palomar	NEAT	EOS	3.2 km	MPC · JPL
173872 Andrewwest	2001 TJ_{245}	Andrewwest	October 14, 2001	Apache Point	SDSS	·	3.2 km	MPC · JPL
173873	2001 TQ_{256}	—	October 10, 2001	Palomar	NEAT	·	2.3 km	MPC · JPL
173874	2001 UO_{10}	—	October 21, 2001	Desert Eagle	W. K. Y. Yeung	·	5.7 km	MPC · JPL
173875	2001 UQ_{14}	—	October 24, 2001	Emerald Lane	L. Ball	·	3.0 km	MPC · JPL
173876	2001 UW_{14}	—	October 24, 2001	Desert Eagle	W. K. Y. Yeung	·	3.6 km	MPC · JPL
173877	2001 UY_{24}	—	October 18, 2001	Socorro	LINEAR	·	6.3 km	MPC · JPL
173878	2001 UN_{38}	—	October 17, 2001	Socorro	LINEAR	·	2.0 km	MPC · JPL
173879	2001 UR_{42}	—	October 17, 2001	Socorro	LINEAR	TIR	3.9 km	MPC · JPL
173880	2001 UQ_{44}	—	October 17, 2001	Socorro	LINEAR	EOS	3.1 km	MPC · JPL
173881	2001 UY_{45}	—	October 17, 2001	Socorro	LINEAR	·	4.1 km	MPC · JPL
173882	2001 UU_{48}	—	October 17, 2001	Socorro	LINEAR	·	6.0 km	MPC · JPL
173883	2001 UB_{55}	—	October 16, 2001	Socorro	LINEAR	·	3.6 km	MPC · JPL
173884	2001 UA_{56}	—	October 17, 2001	Socorro	LINEAR	KOR	1.9 km	MPC · JPL
173885	2001 UA_{61}	—	October 17, 2001	Socorro	LINEAR	KOR	2.2 km	MPC · JPL
173886	2001 UZ_{64}	—	October 18, 2001	Socorro	LINEAR	·	5.8 km	MPC · JPL
173887	2001 UB_{73}	—	October 16, 2001	Socorro	LINEAR	·	5.2 km	MPC · JPL
173888	2001 UC_{82}	—	October 20, 2001	Socorro	LINEAR	·	2.3 km	MPC · JPL
173889	2001 UW_{82}	—	October 20, 2001	Socorro	LINEAR	KOR	2.5 km	MPC · JPL
173890	2001 UM_{90}	—	October 21, 2001	Kitt Peak	Spacewatch	KOR	1.7 km	MPC · JPL
173891	2001 UU_{91}	—	October 18, 2001	Palomar	NEAT	·	4.6 km	MPC · JPL
173892	2001 UE_{98}	—	October 17, 2001	Socorro	LINEAR	EOS	4.4 km	MPC · JPL
173893	2001 UB_{103}	—	October 20, 2001	Socorro	LINEAR	·	3.5 km	MPC · JPL
173894	2001 UD_{107}	—	October 20, 2001	Socorro	LINEAR	KOR	2.4 km	MPC · JPL
173895	2001 UC_{115}	—	October 22, 2001	Socorro	LINEAR	·	2.8 km	MPC · JPL
173896	2001 UM_{116}	—	October 22, 2001	Socorro	LINEAR	·	2.2 km	MPC · JPL
173897	2001 UD_{119}	—	October 22, 2001	Socorro	LINEAR	·	4.3 km	MPC · JPL
173898	2001 UN_{141}	—	October 23, 2001	Socorro	LINEAR	·	3.4 km	MPC · JPL
173899	2001 UG_{144}	—	October 23, 2001	Socorro	LINEAR	·	2.4 km	MPC · JPL
173900	2001 UG_{149}	—	October 23, 2001	Socorro	LINEAR	THM	3.7 km	MPC · JPL

== 173901–174000 ==
back to top

Designation			Discovery			Properties		Ref
Permanent	Provisional	Named after	Date	Site	Discoverer(s)	Category	Diam.	Ref
173901	2001 UR_{160}	—	October 23, 2001	Socorro	LINEAR	TIR	4.2 km	MPC · JPL
173902	2001 UN_{163}	—	October 23, 2001	Socorro	LINEAR	·	4.2 km	MPC · JPL
173903	2001 UH_{179}	—	October 26, 2001	Palomar	NEAT	·	5.1 km	MPC · JPL
173904	2001 UX_{183}	—	October 16, 2001	Socorro	LINEAR	·	4.0 km	MPC · JPL
173905	2001 UZ_{205}	—	October 19, 2001	Palomar	NEAT	EOS	4.8 km	MPC · JPL
173906	2001 UD_{225}	—	October 25, 2001	Socorro	LINEAR	THB	4.7 km	MPC · JPL
173907	2001 VK_{2}	—	November 10, 2001	Badlands	Dyvig, R.	·	5.4 km	MPC · JPL
173908	2001 VW_{10}	—	November 10, 2001	Socorro	LINEAR	·	3.8 km	MPC · JPL
173909	2001 VC_{17}	—	November 10, 2001	Ondřejov	P. Kušnirák, P. Pravec	·	6.1 km	MPC · JPL
173910	2001 VF_{31}	—	November 9, 2001	Socorro	LINEAR	·	5.2 km	MPC · JPL
173911	2001 VS_{31}	—	November 9, 2001	Socorro	LINEAR	TIR	4.4 km	MPC · JPL
173912	2001 VT_{36}	—	November 9, 2001	Socorro	LINEAR	·	3.5 km	MPC · JPL
173913	2001 VA_{42}	—	November 9, 2001	Socorro	LINEAR	VER	4.2 km	MPC · JPL
173914	2001 VA_{48}	—	November 9, 2001	Socorro	LINEAR	EOS	3.6 km	MPC · JPL
173915	2001 VN_{49}	—	November 10, 2001	Socorro	LINEAR	EOS	3.6 km	MPC · JPL
173916	2001 VY_{55}	—	November 10, 2001	Socorro	LINEAR	·	3.8 km	MPC · JPL
173917	2001 VE_{56}	—	November 10, 2001	Socorro	LINEAR	THB	3.8 km	MPC · JPL
173918	2001 VT_{56}	—	November 10, 2001	Socorro	LINEAR	·	2.6 km	MPC · JPL
173919	2001 VR_{58}	—	November 10, 2001	Socorro	LINEAR	·	4.8 km	MPC · JPL
173920	2001 VS_{58}	—	November 10, 2001	Socorro	LINEAR	·	3.7 km	MPC · JPL
173921	2001 VZ_{58}	—	November 10, 2001	Socorro	LINEAR	·	5.2 km	MPC · JPL
173922	2001 VC_{59}	—	November 10, 2001	Socorro	LINEAR	·	4.1 km	MPC · JPL
173923	2001 VN_{70}	—	November 11, 2001	Socorro	LINEAR	·	3.8 km	MPC · JPL
173924	2001 VP_{70}	—	November 11, 2001	Socorro	LINEAR	THM	3.3 km	MPC · JPL
173925	2001 VQ_{84}	—	November 12, 2001	Socorro	LINEAR	·	5.0 km	MPC · JPL
173926	2001 VR_{89}	—	November 12, 2001	Socorro	LINEAR	·	3.8 km	MPC · JPL
173927	2001 VD_{90}	—	November 15, 2001	Socorro	LINEAR	EOS	3.1 km	MPC · JPL
173928	2001 VV_{92}	—	November 15, 2001	Socorro	LINEAR	·	4.1 km	MPC · JPL
173929	2001 VH_{93}	—	November 15, 2001	Socorro	LINEAR	·	4.3 km	MPC · JPL
173930	2001 VV_{95}	—	November 15, 2001	Socorro	LINEAR	T_{j} (2.99)	6.4 km	MPC · JPL
173931	2001 VJ_{104}	—	November 12, 2001	Socorro	LINEAR	·	4.9 km	MPC · JPL
173932	2001 VD_{105}	—	November 12, 2001	Socorro	LINEAR	HYG	4.1 km	MPC · JPL
173933	2001 VS_{114}	—	November 12, 2001	Socorro	LINEAR	·	5.7 km	MPC · JPL
173934	2001 VC_{120}	—	November 12, 2001	Socorro	LINEAR	TIR	5.2 km	MPC · JPL
173935	2001 VA_{125}	—	November 11, 2001	Socorro	LINEAR	·	6.1 km	MPC · JPL
173936 Yuribo	2001 WM_{2}	Yuribo	November 17, 2001	Kuma Kogen	A. Nakamura	·	5.8 km	MPC · JPL
173937	2001 WK_{9}	—	November 17, 2001	Socorro	LINEAR	·	4.0 km	MPC · JPL
173938	2001 WJ_{10}	—	November 17, 2001	Socorro	LINEAR	EOS	3.0 km	MPC · JPL
173939	2001 WH_{12}	—	November 17, 2001	Socorro	LINEAR	EOS	2.8 km	MPC · JPL
173940	2001 WD_{39}	—	November 17, 2001	Socorro	LINEAR	·	5.3 km	MPC · JPL
173941	2001 WN_{51}	—	November 19, 2001	Socorro	LINEAR	·	3.0 km	MPC · JPL
173942	2001 WW_{56}	—	November 19, 2001	Socorro	LINEAR	·	3.0 km	MPC · JPL
173943	2001 WC_{62}	—	November 19, 2001	Socorro	LINEAR	·	5.2 km	MPC · JPL
173944	2001 WO_{63}	—	November 19, 2001	Socorro	LINEAR	THM	2.8 km	MPC · JPL
173945	2001 WY_{65}	—	November 20, 2001	Socorro	LINEAR	·	4.8 km	MPC · JPL
173946	2001 WT_{74}	—	November 20, 2001	Socorro	LINEAR	·	4.3 km	MPC · JPL
173947	2001 WZ_{76}	—	November 20, 2001	Socorro	LINEAR	·	3.2 km	MPC · JPL
173948	2001 WW_{77}	—	November 20, 2001	Socorro	LINEAR	·	3.0 km	MPC · JPL
173949	2001 WH_{95}	—	November 20, 2001	Anderson Mesa	LONEOS	·	5.2 km	MPC · JPL
173950	2001 WC_{96}	—	November 20, 2001	Haleakala	NEAT	·	3.4 km	MPC · JPL
173951	2001 WO_{96}	—	November 17, 2001	Kitt Peak	Spacewatch	·	3.5 km	MPC · JPL
173952	2001 XJ_{7}	—	December 7, 2001	Socorro	LINEAR	·	4.6 km	MPC · JPL
173953	2001 XL_{11}	—	December 9, 2001	Socorro	LINEAR	·	4.6 km	MPC · JPL
173954	2001 XP_{11}	—	December 9, 2001	Socorro	LINEAR	·	5.6 km	MPC · JPL
173955	2001 XU_{11}	—	December 9, 2001	Socorro	LINEAR	TIR	4.2 km	MPC · JPL
173956	2001 XA_{14}	—	December 9, 2001	Socorro	LINEAR	·	5.0 km	MPC · JPL
173957	2001 XQ_{14}	—	December 9, 2001	Socorro	LINEAR	·	4.6 km	MPC · JPL
173958	2001 XR_{20}	—	December 9, 2001	Socorro	LINEAR	·	6.9 km	MPC · JPL
173959	2001 XE_{23}	—	December 9, 2001	Socorro	LINEAR	·	4.8 km	MPC · JPL
173960	2001 XG_{32}	—	December 7, 2001	Kitt Peak	Spacewatch	THM	2.5 km	MPC · JPL
173961	2001 XJ_{34}	—	December 9, 2001	Socorro	LINEAR	·	5.5 km	MPC · JPL
173962	2001 XR_{43}	—	December 9, 2001	Socorro	LINEAR	·	6.1 km	MPC · JPL
173963	2001 XR_{60}	—	December 10, 2001	Socorro	LINEAR	·	3.9 km	MPC · JPL
173964	2001 XF_{69}	—	December 11, 2001	Socorro	LINEAR	·	4.1 km	MPC · JPL
173965	2001 XC_{71}	—	December 11, 2001	Socorro	LINEAR	·	4.7 km	MPC · JPL
173966	2001 XJ_{76}	—	December 11, 2001	Socorro	LINEAR	·	3.9 km	MPC · JPL
173967	2001 XE_{78}	—	December 11, 2001	Socorro	LINEAR	THM	3.2 km	MPC · JPL
173968	2001 XD_{82}	—	December 11, 2001	Socorro	LINEAR	·	5.2 km	MPC · JPL
173969	2001 XF_{82}	—	December 11, 2001	Socorro	LINEAR	·	6.9 km	MPC · JPL
173970	2001 XL_{83}	—	December 11, 2001	Socorro	LINEAR	·	5.9 km	MPC · JPL
173971	2001 XP_{91}	—	December 10, 2001	Socorro	LINEAR	·	4.5 km	MPC · JPL
173972	2001 XR_{111}	—	December 11, 2001	Socorro	LINEAR	·	4.4 km	MPC · JPL
173973	2001 XL_{122}	—	December 14, 2001	Socorro	LINEAR	EOS	2.6 km	MPC · JPL
173974	2001 XV_{127}	—	December 14, 2001	Socorro	LINEAR	·	5.9 km	MPC · JPL
173975	2001 XL_{131}	—	December 14, 2001	Socorro	LINEAR	·	3.7 km	MPC · JPL
173976	2001 XG_{132}	—	December 14, 2001	Socorro	LINEAR	·	5.0 km	MPC · JPL
173977	2001 XU_{133}	—	December 14, 2001	Socorro	LINEAR	·	4.8 km	MPC · JPL
173978	2001 XE_{135}	—	December 14, 2001	Socorro	LINEAR	·	5.7 km	MPC · JPL
173979	2001 XK_{135}	—	December 14, 2001	Socorro	LINEAR	·	4.5 km	MPC · JPL
173980	2001 XY_{135}	—	December 14, 2001	Socorro	LINEAR	·	3.8 km	MPC · JPL
173981	2001 XK_{139}	—	December 14, 2001	Socorro	LINEAR	EOS	3.2 km	MPC · JPL
173982	2001 XM_{140}	—	December 14, 2001	Socorro	LINEAR	THM	3.0 km	MPC · JPL
173983	2001 XB_{142}	—	December 14, 2001	Socorro	LINEAR	·	2.7 km	MPC · JPL
173984	2001 XS_{148}	—	December 14, 2001	Socorro	LINEAR	·	3.6 km	MPC · JPL
173985	2001 XB_{157}	—	December 14, 2001	Socorro	LINEAR	·	6.2 km	MPC · JPL
173986	2001 XL_{158}	—	December 14, 2001	Socorro	LINEAR	THM	3.4 km	MPC · JPL
173987	2001 XK_{162}	—	December 14, 2001	Socorro	LINEAR	THM	2.9 km	MPC · JPL
173988	2001 XT_{163}	—	December 14, 2001	Socorro	LINEAR	·	4.2 km	MPC · JPL
173989	2001 XB_{164}	—	December 14, 2001	Socorro	LINEAR	LIX	7.1 km	MPC · JPL
173990	2001 XG_{170}	—	December 14, 2001	Socorro	LINEAR	·	4.4 km	MPC · JPL
173991	2001 XR_{170}	—	December 14, 2001	Socorro	LINEAR	THM	3.5 km	MPC · JPL
173992	2001 XM_{178}	—	December 14, 2001	Socorro	LINEAR	·	5.8 km	MPC · JPL
173993	2001 XG_{198}	—	December 14, 2001	Socorro	LINEAR	·	7.7 km	MPC · JPL
173994	2001 XS_{200}	—	December 15, 2001	Socorro	LINEAR	·	6.2 km	MPC · JPL
173995	2001 XV_{204}	—	December 11, 2001	Socorro	LINEAR	EOS	2.6 km	MPC · JPL
173996	2001 XT_{205}	—	December 11, 2001	Socorro	LINEAR	·	4.8 km	MPC · JPL
173997	2001 XJ_{207}	—	December 11, 2001	Socorro	LINEAR	HYG	4.6 km	MPC · JPL
173998	2001 XX_{208}	—	December 11, 2001	Socorro	LINEAR	·	3.0 km	MPC · JPL
173999	2001 XQ_{222}	—	December 15, 2001	Socorro	LINEAR	·	3.5 km	MPC · JPL
174000	2001 XE_{233}	—	December 15, 2001	Socorro	LINEAR	·	4.2 km	MPC · JPL

back to top

== See also ==
- Meanings of minor-planet names: 173001–174000
