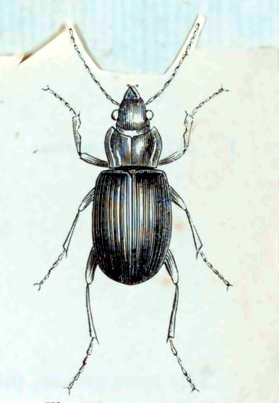
- Image of Abaris aenea in the Iconographia Zoologica

Scientific classification
- Domain: Eukaryota
- Kingdom: Animalia
- Phylum: Arthropoda
- Class: Insecta
- Order: Coleoptera
- Suborder: Adephaga
- Family: Carabidae
- Subtribe: Euchroina
- Genus: Abaris; Dejean, 1831

= Abaris (beetle) =

Genus of beetles

Abaris is a genus of beetles in the family Carabidae, containing the following species:

- Abaris aenea Dejean, 1831
- Abaris aequinoctialis Chaudoir, 1852
- Abaris aquilonaria Will, 2002
- Abaris basistriata Chaudoir, 1873
- Abaris bicolor Will, 2002
- Abaris bigenera Bates, 1882
- Abaris convexa Will, 2002
- Abaris erwini Will, 2002
- Abaris franiai Will, 2002
- Abaris impunctata Will, 2002
- Abaris inaequaloides Will, 2002
- Abaris inflata Will, 2002
- Abaris metallica Will, 2002
- Abaris mina Will, 2002
- Abaris napoensis Will, 2002
- Abaris nigra Will, 2002
- Abaris nitida Will, 2002
- Abaris nobilis Will, 2002
- Abaris notiophiloides Bates, 1871
- Abaris opaca Will, 2002
- Abaris picipes Bates, 1871
- Abaris retiaria Will, 2002
- Abaris robustula Tschitscherine, 1898
- Abaris splendidula (LeConte, 1863)
- Abaris striolata Bates, 1871
- Abaris tachypoides Bates, 1871
- Abaris wardi Will, 2002
