= Abaris (Caucasian) =

In Greek mythology, a Caucasian in the court of King Cepheus of Ethiopia

In Ovid's Metamorphoses, Abaris (Ancient Greek: Ἄβαρις) is a companion of Phineus. He is killed by the hero Perseus, along with the other Ethiopian chiefs, during his battle with Phineus, brother of the king and betrothed of Andromeda:

"And next he [i.e. Perseus] slew Caucasian Abaris, and Polydaemon—from Semiramis nobly descended—and Sperchius, son, Lycetus, long-haired Elyces, unshorn, Clytus and Phlegias, the hero slew;—and trampled on the dying heaped around"
