= Doliones =

In Greek mythology, a people living on the coast of the Propontis

In Greek mythology, the Doliones (Ancient Greek: Δολίονες) or Dolionians were the people living on the coast of the Propontis (northwestern Asia Minor), visited by the Argonauts. They were ruled by Cyzicus, son of Aeneus and Aenete.

== Mythology ==
After the departure of the Argonauts in Lemnos, they came to the land of the Doliones of whom Cyzicus was the king. Cyzicus welcomed the Argonauts on their journey to Colchis and received them with generous hospitality. But after their departure, a storm drove them back to the Cyzicene coast at night.

With neither the Argonauts nor King Cyzicus and the Doliones recognizing one another, each mistook the other as an enemy and battle ensued (according to Apollonius of Rhodes' Argonautica and Apollodorus' Bibliotheca, the Doliones thought the returning Argonauts were a Pelasgian army who constantly harassed them). A fragment attributed to 4th century BCE historian Ephorus in the Scholia on Apollonius of Rhodes’ Argonautica, however, named the Doliones a Pelasgian people. The Argonauts slew many natives, including King Cyzicus who was killed either by Jason or Heracles.

== List of Dolionians ==
Name	Killer	Name	Killer
Abaris	Jason	Artaceus	Meleager
Admon (Hidmon)	Heracles	Basileus	Telamon
Amastrus	Nestor	Gephyrus	Peleus
Ambrosius	Peleus	Itymoneus	Meleager
Bienor		Megabrontes	Heracles
Brontes	Jason	Megalossaces	Dioscuri
Corythus	Tydeus	Phlogius	Dioscuri
Cotys		Promeus	Idas
Dorceus	Jason	Sphodris	Acastus
Echeclus	Ancaeus	Telecles	Heracles
Erymus		Zelys	Jason
Genysus			
Glaucus	Jason		
Hages	Polydeuces		
Halys	Jason		
Hebrus	Polydeuces		
Iron			
Itys	Castor		
Medon			
Melanthus	Telamon		
Nealces	Polydeuces		
Nisaeus	Telamon		
Ochus	Phlias		
Opheltes	Telamon		
Ornytus	Idmon		
Phlegyas	Heracles		
Phoceus	Telamon		
Protis	Jason		
Pyrnus	?		
Sages	Hylas		
Telecoon	Ancaeus		
Thapsus	Polydeuces		
Zelys	Peleus		
