= Abaris (Aeneid) =

Character in the epic poem The Aeneid

- an Ally of Turnus
- Abode: Territory of the Rutuli in Italy
- Battles: Fight between Trojans and Rutuli

In the Aeneid of Virgil, Abaris (Ancient Greek: Ἄβαρις) was a warrior of Turnus, the man who resisted the Trojan hero, Aeneas in Italy. He was killed by Euryalus, in the battle between the Trojans and the Rutuli.

== Mythology ==
"Nor was the sword of fair Euryalus less fatal found; but fiercely raging on his path of death, he pressed on through a base and nameless throng, Rhoetus, Herbesus, Fadus, Abaris.."
