= Cyzicus (mythology) =

In Greek mythology, the ruler of the Dolionians

In Greek mythology, King Cyzicus or Kyzikos (Ancient Greek: Κύζικος, romanized: Kúzikos) was the ruler of the Dolionians, a tribe that inhabited the southern shore of the Propontis (the Sea of Marmara). He gave his name to a city of the same name, Cyzicus, his capital.

== Family ==
Cyzicus's parentage is given as Aeneus by Aenete (or Aenippe), daughter of Eusorus or by Euantheia; or else Eusorus is given as his father. King Cyzicus is sometimes referred to as a Thessalian migrant (hence his hospitality to the Argonauts, many of whom hailed from Thessaly, including Jason himself). The name Aeneus recalls the Thracian city of Aenus, although Aeneus is said to be the son of Apollo and Stilbe, a daughter of the Thessalian River Peneus. His wife was Cleite, daughter of Merops of Percote, others say that she was Larissa, daughter of Piasus.

== Mythology ==
After the departure of the Argonauts in Lemnos, they landed in the island of the Doliones of whom Cyzicus was the king. He welcomed the Argonauts on their journey to Colchis and received them with generous hospitality. But after their departure, a storm drove them back to the Cyzicene coast at night. With neither the Argonauts nor King Cyzicus recognizing one another, each mistook the other as an enemy and battle ensued. The Doliones thought they were a Pelasgian army who constantly harassed them.

The enemy have seized the harbour, our hold foes the Pelasgians have returned!” Men’s rest was broken; the god Pan had driven the doubting city distraught, Pan fulfilling the cruel commands of the Mygdonian Mother [i.e. Cybele], Pan lord of the woodlands and of war, whom from the daylight hours caverns shelter; about midnight in lonely places are seen that hairy flank and the soughing leafage on his fierce brow.

The Argonauts slew many of the Dolionians, among whom was King Cyzicus who was himself killed either by Jason or Heracles. The incident had been arranged by the gods Cybele, Pan and Bellona because Cybele wanted revenge against the king for killing one of her lions. Valerius Flaccus recounts this account in the following passage:

As Cyzicus upon his swift horse shook Dindymus where votaries revel with bloodstained arms, and wearied the woods, he was betrayed by his too great love of the chase; for with his javelin he slew a lion that was wont to bear its mistress [i.e. Cybele] through the cities of Phrygia and was now returning to the bridle. And now (Madman!) hath he hung from his doorposts the mane and the head of his victim, a spoil to bring sorrow to himself and shame upon the goddess. But she, nursing her great rage, beholds from the cymbal-clashing mountain the ship with its border of kingly shields, and devises against the hero deaths and horrors unheard of: how in the night to set allied hands at strife in unnatural war, how to enmesh the city in cruel error.

When day broke, the Argonauts realized their tragic mistake, and granted Cyzicus an elaborate burial.

They [i.e. Argonauts] lamented for three days and tore out their hair; they raised a mound over the grave, marched round it thrice in armour, performed funeral rites, and celebrated games in honour of the dead man. The mound was to be seen down to later days, and the people of Cyzicus continued to pour libations at it every year.

After the burial, the Argonauts handed over the kingdom to Cyzicus's sons, then sailed away and touched at Mysia. King Cyzicus left behind his young bride Cleite, who hung herself after her husband's tragic death.
