= Aenete =

Ancient Greek mythological figure

In Greek mythology, Aenete (Ancient Greek: Αἰνήτη, romanized: Ainetē) was the daughter of Eusorus, and wife of Aeneus, by whom she had a son, Cyzicus, the founder of the town of this name. In some traditions she is called Aenippe.

== Mythology ==
=== Apollonius' Argonautica ===
"And about the isthmus and the plain the Doliones had their dwelling, and over them Cyzicus son of Aeneus was king, whom Aenete the daughter of goodly Eusorus bare."

=== Orphic Argonautica ===
"Cyzicus, the son of Aeneus who ruled over all the Doliones, came up and took a place among the heroes. He had been born to a most noble woman, Aenete, daughter of Eusorus."
