= Meanings of minor-planet names: 175001–176000 =

As minor planet discoveries are confirmed, they are given a permanent number by the IAU's Minor Planet Center (MPC), and the discoverers can then submit names for them, following the IAU's naming conventions. The list below concerns those minor planets in the specified number-range that have received names, and explains the meanings of those names.

Official naming citations of newly named small Solar System bodies are approved and published in a bulletin by IAU's Working Group for Small Bodies Nomenclature (WGSBN). Before May 2021, citations were published in MPC's Minor Planet Circulars for many decades. Recent citations can also be found on the JPL Small-Body Database (SBDB). Until his death in 2016, German astronomer Lutz D. Schmadel compiled these citations into the Dictionary of Minor Planet Names (DMP) and regularly updated the collection.

Based on Paul Herget's The Names of the Minor Planets, Schmadel also researched the unclear origin of numerous asteroids, most of which had been named prior to World War II. This article incorporates text from this source, which is in the public domain: SBDB New namings may only be added to this list below after official publication as the preannouncement of names is condemned. The WGSBN publishes a comprehensive guideline for the naming rules of non-cometary small Solar System bodies.

== 175001–175100 ==
Named minor planet	Provisional	This minor planet was named for...	Ref · Catalog
175017 Záboří	2004 FW_{18}	The village of Záboří, Czech Republic, was first mentioned in 1263, and is known for its traditional South Bohemian Rustic Baroque architecture style	JPL · 175017
175046 Corporon	2004 FD_{92}	Serge Corporon (born 1948), French electronics engineer, who works with the discoverer in constructing a very sensitive CCD camera for the Meudon Observatory	JPL · 175046

== 175101–175200 ==
back to top

Named minor planet	Provisional	This minor planet was named for...	Ref · Catalog
175109 Sharickaer	2004 MN_{7}	Sharvel Gretzner (born 1986), American veterinarian assistant, and Rick Kaer, American construction worker, friends of the discoverer Mallory Vale	JPL · 175109
175152 Marthafarkas	2005 ET_{37}	Martha Farkas (born 1959) is one of Canada's most experienced amateur astronomers.	JPL · 175152
175166 Adirondack	2005 EZ_{99}	The Adirondack Astronomy Retreat was designed to inspire observers to return to their astronomical roots. Since its inception in 2004, this retreat allowed many dark-sky enthusiasts to enjoy, share, and bond under some of the best observing conditions in the northeastern portion of North America.	JPL · 175166

== 175201–175300 ==
back to top

Named minor planet	Provisional	This minor planet was named for...	Ref · Catalog
175203 Kingston	2005 FS_{4}	Harold R. Kingston (1885–1963) was the founder of the London Center of the Royal Astronomical Society of Canada. Kingston became the national president of the RASC in 1930. This naming is in celebration of the 100th anniversary of the London Center's founding in 1922.	IAU · 175203
175204 Gregbyrne	2005 FT_{5}	Greg Byrne (born 1955) is a space physicist. He began his NASA career training astronauts for Space Shuttle flights, served as the chief of Astromaterials Research & Exploration Science at Johnson Space Center; and the NASA chair professor of space systems at the Naval Postgraduate School.	JPL · 175204
175208 Vorbourg	2005 GA_{14}	The "Vorbourg", is a castle ruin from the 12th century, located near Delémont, Switzerland	JPL · 175208
175238 Nguyenhien	2005 GK_{187}	Hien Nguyen (born 1968) is a systems engineer at the Johns Hopkins University Applied Physics Laboratory. He served as the Senior Ground Systems Hardware Engineer for the New Horizons Mission to Pluto.	JPL · 175238
175259 Offenberger	2005 JH_{91}	Allan Offenberger (born 1938), Canadian physicist, professor emeritus at the University of Alberta, and thesis advisor of the discoverer Bernard Christophe	JPL · 175259
175281 Kolonics	2005 KG_{9}	György Kolonics (1972–2008), a Hungarian canoeist	JPL · 175281
175282 Benhida	2005 LA	Abdelmjid Benhida (born 1963) is an astrophysics researcher in Cadi Ayyad University's department of physics in Marrakech	JPL · 175282

== 175301–175400 ==
back to top

Named minor planet	Provisional	This minor planet was named for...	Ref · Catalog
175301 Mathur	2005 LC_{47}	Jagdish (Jag) Mathur (b. 1942) is an American with a PhD in Physics from NC State University. As an educator his efforts enabled many thousands of community college students to embark on careers in science and technology. As a research scientist he led a team in the development of laser guidance systems.	IAU · 175301
175365 Carsac	2005 QO_{143}	François Bordes (1919–1981), also known by the pen name of Francis Carsac, was a French science-fiction author geologist and archaeologist	JPL · 175365
175397 Oumousangaré	2006 OS_{6}	Oumou Sangaré, Malian singer and songwriter.	IAU · 175397

== 175401–175500 ==
back to top

Named minor planet	Provisional	This minor planet was named for...	Ref · Catalog
175410 Tsayweanshun	2006 PB_{8}	Tsay Wean-Shun, pioneer in optical astronomy who worked at the Lulin Observatory in Taiwan	JPL · 175410
175411 Yilan	2006 PC_{8}	Yilan, a county in northeastern Taiwan.	JPL · 175411
175419 Albiesachs	2006 PN_{17}	Albie Sachs (born 1935), Judge to the Constitutional Court of South Africa.	JPL · 175419
175437 Zsivótzky	2006 QJ_{31}	Gyula Zsivótzky (1937–2007) was a Hungarian hammer thrower. Olympic champion in 1968, silver medalist in 1960 and 1964, and winner of the Summer Universiade in 1965, Zsivótzky set two world records, and he was elected as Hungarian Sportsman of the Year in 1965 and 1968. Name suggested by Z. Kolláth.	JPL · 175437
175450 Phillipklu	2006 QN_{58}	Phillip K. Lu (born 1932), a Chinese-born astronomer, translator and poet	JPL · 175450
175451 Linchisheng	2006 QP_{58}	Lin Qisheng (born 1964) is a Taiwanese amateur astronomer and discoverer of minor planets	JPL · 175451
175452 Chenggong	2006 QR_{58}	Taipei Municipal ChengGong Senior High School, established in 1922, is one of the best middle schools in Taipei.	JPL · 175452
175476 Macheret	2006 RA_{1}	Augustin Macheret (born 1938), Swiss professor of law and rector of the University of Fribourg, chairman of the Foundation Robert A. Naef, owner of the discovery site	JPL · 175476

== 175501–175600 ==
back to top

Named minor planet	Provisional	This minor planet was named for...	Ref · Catalog
175548 Sudzius	2006 SG_{285}	Jokubas Sudzius (born 1946), associate professor at the Astronomical Observatory of Vilnius University	JPL · 175548
175562 Ajsingh	2006 SF_{382}	Amanjot Singh (born 1988) was an undergraduate student in the Pre-Major in Astronomy Program at the University of Washington, where he conducted research into discovering asteroids using data from the Sloan Digital Sky Survey.	JPL · 175562
175563 Amyrose	2006 SR_{389}	Amy Rose (born 1987) is an American astronomer who helped discover asteroids as a part of her undergraduate research with the Pre-Major in Astronomy Program at the University of Washington.	JPL · 175563
175566 Papplaci	2006 TM_{7}	László Papp (nicknamed Laci Papp; 1926–2003), a Hungarian boxer and three-time Olympic gold medalist.	JPL · 175566
175567 Csadaimre	2006 TM_{10}	Imre Csada (1916–1992), a Hungarian physicist and astronomer.	IAU · 175567
175583 Pingtung	2006 TV_{94}	Pingtung County, the southernmost county in Taiwan.	JPL · 175583
175586 Tsou	2006 TU_{106}	Tsou tribe, native tribe in Taiwan	JPL · 175586
175588 Kathrynsmith	2006 TK_{117}	Kathryn G. Smith (born 1988), an American astronomer and geologist	JPL · 175588

== 175601–175700 ==
back to top

Named minor planet	Provisional	This minor planet was named for...	Ref · Catalog
175613 Shikoku-karst	2006 VB_{95}	Shikoku Karst, a karst plateau located at the border of Ehime and Kochi prefectures, Japan	JPL · 175613
175625 Canaryastroinst	2007 OK_{7}	The Instituto de Astrofísica de Canarias, an astrophysical research institute located in the Canary Islands, Spain. It was founded in 1975.	IAU · 175625
175629 Lambertini	2007 SX_{1}	Giovanni Lambertini (1916–1997), an Italian friar and science enthusiast, one of the founders of the group of amateur astronomers in Ravenna, Italy, and mentor of two of the discoverers	JPL · 175629
175633 Yaoan	2007 TF_{184}	Yaoan, county in the north of Yunnan Province, China, where the Yaoan Observation Station (O49) of the Purple Mountain Observatory (which discovered this minor planet) has been built.	JPL · 175633
175636 Zvyagel	2007 UP_{4}	Zvyagel, ancient name of Novohrad-Volynskyi, Ukraine, birthplace of Larysa Petrivna Kosach, a.k.a. Lesya Ukrainka, 19th–20th-century poet and writer, on the occasion of the 750th anniversary of Zvyagel in 2007	JPL · 175636

== 175701–175800 ==
back to top

Named minor planet	Provisional	This minor planet was named for...	Ref · Catalog
175718 Wuzhengyi	1997 CG_{19}	Wu Zhengyi (1916–2013), botanist-academician of the Chinese Academy of Sciences	JPL · 175718
175726 Borda	1997 QJ_{1}	Jean-Charles, chevalier de Borda (1733–1799), a French scientist and sailor	JPL · 175726
175730 Gramastetten	1998 DM_{1}	Gramastetten is the site of an observatory outpost of the Linz public observatory.	JPL · 175730
175736 Pierreléna	1998 HJ_{6}	Pierre Léna, French astrophysicist, academician and university professor.	IAU · 175736

== 175801–175900 ==
back to top

Named minor planet	Provisional	This minor planet was named for...	Ref · Catalog
There are no named minor planets in this number range

== 175901–176000 ==
back to top

Named minor planet	Provisional	This minor planet was named for...	Ref · Catalog
175920 Francisnimmo	2000 CO_{118}	Francis Nimmo (born 1971), a professor at the University of California, Santa Cruz, who served as a Science Team Collaborator for the interior geophysics investigation for the New Horizons mission to Pluto	JPL · 175920

back to top

Preceded by 174,001–175,000	Meanings of minor-planet names List of minor planets: 175,001–176,000	Succeeded by 176,001–177,000
