= List of minor planets: 175001–176000 =

The following is a partial list of minor planets, running from minor-planet number 175001 through 176000, inclusive. The primary data for this and other partial lists is based on JPL's "Small-Body Orbital Elements" and data available from the Minor Planet Center. Critical list information is also provided by the MPC, unless otherwise specified from Lowell Observatory. A detailed description of the table's columns and additional sources are given on the main page including a complete list of every page in this series, and a statistical break-up on the dynamical classification of minor planets.

Also see the summary list of all named bodies in numerical and alphabetical order, and the corresponding naming citations for the number range of this particular list. New namings may only be added to this list after official publication, as the preannouncement of names is condemned by the Working Group for Small Bodies Nomenclature of the International Astronomical Union.

Near-Earth obj.	MBA (inner)	MBA (outer)	Centaur
Mars-crosser	MBA (middle)	Jupiter trojan	Trans-Neptunian obj.
Unclassified

== 175001–175100 ==
Designation			Discovery			Properties		Ref
Permanent	Provisional	Named after	Date	Site	Discoverer(s)	Category	Diam.	Ref
175001	2004 EZ_{64}	—	March 14, 2004	Socorro	LINEAR	EUN	3.0 km	MPC · JPL
175002	2004 EP_{68}	—	March 15, 2004	Socorro	LINEAR	EUN	1.9 km	MPC · JPL
175003	2004 EN_{69}	—	March 15, 2004	Kitt Peak	Spacewatch	AGN	1.6 km	MPC · JPL
175004	2004 ER_{71}	—	March 15, 2004	Catalina	CSS	·	3.0 km	MPC · JPL
175005	2004 EA_{73}	—	March 15, 2004	Socorro	LINEAR	·	2.9 km	MPC · JPL
175006	2004 EJ_{73}	—	March 15, 2004	Catalina	CSS	·	2.2 km	MPC · JPL
175007	2004 ET_{79}	—	March 12, 2004	Palomar	NEAT	·	4.1 km	MPC · JPL
175008	2004 EU_{80}	—	March 15, 2004	Socorro	LINEAR	·	3.7 km	MPC · JPL
175009	2004 EL_{81}	—	March 15, 2004	Socorro	LINEAR	·	4.2 km	MPC · JPL
175010	2004 EK_{86}	—	March 15, 2004	Socorro	LINEAR	·	2.6 km	MPC · JPL
175011	2004 EX_{94}	—	March 15, 2004	Socorro	LINEAR	·	2.6 km	MPC · JPL
175012	2004 EO_{114}	—	March 11, 2004	Palomar	NEAT	·	2.5 km	MPC · JPL
175013	2004 EC_{116}	—	March 14, 2004	Palomar	NEAT	EOS	4.3 km	MPC · JPL
175014	2004 FG_{9}	—	March 16, 2004	Socorro	LINEAR	·	3.6 km	MPC · JPL
175015	2004 FL_{11}	—	March 16, 2004	Catalina	CSS	·	3.6 km	MPC · JPL
175016	2004 FU_{14}	—	March 16, 2004	Catalina	CSS	DOR	4.6 km	MPC · JPL
175017 Záboří	2004 FW_{18}	Záboří	March 28, 2004	Kleť	KLENOT	·	3.4 km	MPC · JPL
175018	2004 FC_{20}	—	March 16, 2004	Socorro	LINEAR	·	5.2 km	MPC · JPL
175019	2004 FN_{24}	—	March 17, 2004	Catalina	CSS	BRA	2.3 km	MPC · JPL
175020	2004 FK_{26}	—	March 17, 2004	Kitt Peak	Spacewatch	AGN	1.6 km	MPC · JPL
175021	2004 FO_{26}	—	March 17, 2004	Kitt Peak	Spacewatch	·	3.4 km	MPC · JPL
175022	2004 FM_{27}	—	March 17, 2004	Kitt Peak	Spacewatch	URS	3.9 km	MPC · JPL
175023	2004 FU_{27}	—	March 17, 2004	Kitt Peak	Spacewatch	·	4.9 km	MPC · JPL
175024	2004 FU_{29}	—	March 27, 2004	Bergisch Gladbach	W. Bickel	·	5.5 km	MPC · JPL
175025	2004 FE_{33}	—	March 16, 2004	Catalina	CSS	EUN	2.0 km	MPC · JPL
175026	2004 FB_{34}	—	March 16, 2004	Socorro	LINEAR	·	3.8 km	MPC · JPL
175027	2004 FW_{35}	—	March 16, 2004	Socorro	LINEAR	·	3.8 km	MPC · JPL
175028	2004 FG_{39}	—	March 17, 2004	Kitt Peak	Spacewatch	·	2.9 km	MPC · JPL
175029	2004 FJ_{39}	—	March 17, 2004	Kitt Peak	Spacewatch	·	1.8 km	MPC · JPL
175030	2004 FN_{40}	—	March 18, 2004	Socorro	LINEAR	·	2.8 km	MPC · JPL
175031	2004 FF_{44}	—	March 16, 2004	Catalina	CSS	·	3.1 km	MPC · JPL
175032	2004 FC_{45}	—	March 16, 2004	Socorro	LINEAR	·	2.5 km	MPC · JPL
175033	2004 FD_{48}	—	March 18, 2004	Socorro	LINEAR	·	4.7 km	MPC · JPL
175034	2004 FH_{49}	—	March 18, 2004	Socorro	LINEAR	·	2.7 km	MPC · JPL
175035	2004 FM_{55}	—	March 19, 2004	Socorro	LINEAR	·	3.5 km	MPC · JPL
175036	2004 FO_{56}	—	March 16, 2004	Kitt Peak	Spacewatch	·	2.6 km	MPC · JPL
175037	2004 FO_{58}	—	March 17, 2004	Kitt Peak	Spacewatch	·	3.8 km	MPC · JPL
175038	2004 FR_{62}	—	March 19, 2004	Socorro	LINEAR	AGN	2.2 km	MPC · JPL
175039	2004 FP_{67}	—	March 20, 2004	Socorro	LINEAR	·	2.0 km	MPC · JPL
175040	2004 FZ_{67}	—	March 20, 2004	Socorro	LINEAR	·	2.2 km	MPC · JPL
175041	2004 FF_{70}	—	March 16, 2004	Kitt Peak	Spacewatch	·	2.7 km	MPC · JPL
175042	2004 FM_{74}	—	March 17, 2004	Kitt Peak	Spacewatch	·	1.9 km	MPC · JPL
175043	2004 FZ_{80}	—	March 16, 2004	Socorro	LINEAR	·	5.6 km	MPC · JPL
175044	2004 FF_{81}	—	March 16, 2004	Socorro	LINEAR	MRX	1.5 km	MPC · JPL
175045	2004 FE_{82}	—	March 17, 2004	Kitt Peak	Spacewatch	·	3.3 km	MPC · JPL
175046 Corporon	2004 FD_{92}	Corporon	March 27, 2004	Saint-Sulpice	B. Christophe	·	2.3 km	MPC · JPL
175047	2004 FK_{93}	—	March 20, 2004	Socorro	LINEAR	·	3.2 km	MPC · JPL
175048	2004 FV_{94}	—	March 19, 2004	Palomar	NEAT	EOS	3.8 km	MPC · JPL
175049	2004 FK_{100}	—	March 23, 2004	Kitt Peak	Spacewatch	·	2.5 km	MPC · JPL
175050	2004 FA_{102}	—	March 19, 2004	Socorro	LINEAR	·	3.6 km	MPC · JPL
175051	2004 FT_{108}	—	March 23, 2004	Kitt Peak	Spacewatch	·	3.0 km	MPC · JPL
175052	2004 FH_{109}	—	March 24, 2004	Anderson Mesa	LONEOS	KOR	2.2 km	MPC · JPL
175053	2004 FO_{116}	—	March 23, 2004	Socorro	LINEAR	·	3.1 km	MPC · JPL
175054	2004 FN_{118}	—	March 22, 2004	Socorro	LINEAR	·	2.8 km	MPC · JPL
175055	2004 FR_{122}	—	March 26, 2004	Socorro	LINEAR	·	2.9 km	MPC · JPL
175056	2004 FX_{130}	—	March 22, 2004	Anderson Mesa	LONEOS	·	3.5 km	MPC · JPL
175057	2004 FT_{134}	—	March 26, 2004	Socorro	LINEAR	·	2.6 km	MPC · JPL
175058	2004 FQ_{140}	—	March 27, 2004	Anderson Mesa	LONEOS	·	3.8 km	MPC · JPL
175059	2004 FV_{149}	—	March 16, 2004	Socorro	LINEAR	·	2.8 km	MPC · JPL
175060	2004 FC_{158}	—	March 17, 2004	Kitt Peak	Spacewatch	·	2.4 km	MPC · JPL
175061	2004 FH_{160}	—	March 18, 2004	Catalina	CSS	ADE	2.8 km	MPC · JPL
175062	2004 GJ	—	April 9, 2004	Palomar	NEAT	·	6.5 km	MPC · JPL
175063	2004 GS_{1}	—	April 9, 2004	Siding Spring	SSS	THM	3.1 km	MPC · JPL
175064	2004 GP_{13}	—	April 13, 2004	Palomar	NEAT	·	3.9 km	MPC · JPL
175065	2004 GA_{15}	—	April 12, 2004	Reedy Creek	J. Broughton	·	7.0 km	MPC · JPL
175066	2004 GY_{21}	—	April 12, 2004	Kitt Peak	Spacewatch	KOR	1.9 km	MPC · JPL
175067	2004 GT_{23}	—	April 13, 2004	Kitt Peak	Spacewatch	·	2.9 km	MPC · JPL
175068	2004 GF_{27}	—	April 15, 2004	Socorro	LINEAR	BRA	2.6 km	MPC · JPL
175069	2004 GU_{28}	—	April 15, 2004	Uccle	Uccle	·	3.1 km	MPC · JPL
175070	2004 GJ_{32}	—	April 12, 2004	Palomar	NEAT	·	3.8 km	MPC · JPL
175071	2004 GC_{35}	—	April 13, 2004	Palomar	NEAT	DOR	4.4 km	MPC · JPL
175072	2004 GB_{36}	—	April 13, 2004	Palomar	NEAT	·	3.0 km	MPC · JPL
175073	2004 GO_{37}	—	April 14, 2004	Anderson Mesa	LONEOS	·	3.6 km	MPC · JPL
175074	2004 GD_{40}	—	April 11, 2004	Palomar	NEAT	·	2.7 km	MPC · JPL
175075	2004 GR_{40}	—	April 12, 2004	Kitt Peak	Spacewatch	THM	2.9 km	MPC · JPL
175076	2004 GZ_{40}	—	April 12, 2004	Siding Spring	SSS	EUN	2.4 km	MPC · JPL
175077	2004 GS_{43}	—	April 12, 2004	Palomar	NEAT	·	2.0 km	MPC · JPL
175078	2004 GJ_{56}	—	April 13, 2004	Kitt Peak	Spacewatch	AGN	1.6 km	MPC · JPL
175079	2004 GC_{59}	—	April 12, 2004	Kitt Peak	Spacewatch	·	3.2 km	MPC · JPL
175080	2004 GA_{66}	—	April 13, 2004	Kitt Peak	Spacewatch	AGN	1.4 km	MPC · JPL
175081	2004 GQ_{68}	—	April 13, 2004	Kitt Peak	Spacewatch	HOF	4.2 km	MPC · JPL
175082	2004 GO_{76}	—	April 15, 2004	Socorro	LINEAR	·	2.7 km	MPC · JPL
175083	2004 GD_{81}	—	April 13, 2004	Kitt Peak	Spacewatch	(7744)	1.8 km	MPC · JPL
175084	2004 GP_{86}	—	April 14, 2004	Kitt Peak	Spacewatch	·	1.9 km	MPC · JPL
175085	2004 HZ_{15}	—	April 16, 2004	Socorro	LINEAR	·	6.6 km	MPC · JPL
175086	2004 HH_{22}	—	April 16, 2004	Kitt Peak	Spacewatch	·	2.4 km	MPC · JPL
175087	2004 HO_{26}	—	April 20, 2004	Socorro	LINEAR	HOF	5.1 km	MPC · JPL
175088	2004 HK_{37}	—	April 21, 2004	Catalina	CSS	·	5.2 km	MPC · JPL
175089	2004 HY_{47}	—	April 22, 2004	Siding Spring	SSS	RAF	1.4 km	MPC · JPL
175090	2004 HN_{52}	—	April 24, 2004	Socorro	LINEAR	·	3.0 km	MPC · JPL
175091	2004 HB_{53}	—	April 25, 2004	Catalina	CSS	·	7.8 km	MPC · JPL
175092	2004 HJ_{55}	—	April 24, 2004	Catalina	CSS	·	3.1 km	MPC · JPL
175093	2004 HP_{55}	—	April 24, 2004	Socorro	LINEAR	GEF	5.0 km	MPC · JPL
175094	2004 HK_{66}	—	April 20, 2004	Kitt Peak	Spacewatch	·	4.3 km	MPC · JPL
175095	2004 JC_{1}	—	May 9, 2004	Haleakala	NEAT	·	4.2 km	MPC · JPL
175096	2004 JJ_{3}	—	May 9, 2004	Kitt Peak	Spacewatch	·	3.0 km	MPC · JPL
175097	2004 JG_{17}	—	May 12, 2004	Siding Spring	SSS	·	3.7 km	MPC · JPL
175098	2004 JF_{18}	—	May 13, 2004	Anderson Mesa	LONEOS	MAR	2.1 km	MPC · JPL
175099	2004 JF_{21}	—	May 9, 2004	Kitt Peak	Spacewatch	·	2.3 km	MPC · JPL
175100	2004 JZ_{35}	—	May 13, 2004	Anderson Mesa	LONEOS	·	4.7 km	MPC · JPL

== 175101–175200 ==
back to top

Designation			Discovery			Properties		Ref
Permanent	Provisional	Named after	Date	Site	Discoverer(s)	Category	Diam.	Ref
175101	2004 JA_{40}	—	May 14, 2004	Kitt Peak	Spacewatch	SYL · CYB	7.5 km	MPC · JPL
175102	2004 JP_{42}	—	May 15, 2004	Socorro	LINEAR	·	3.9 km	MPC · JPL
175103	2004 JB_{56}	—	May 12, 2004	Catalina	CSS	·	4.9 km	MPC · JPL
175104	2004 KC_{6}	—	May 17, 2004	Socorro	LINEAR	·	3.1 km	MPC · JPL
175105	2004 KC_{9}	—	May 18, 2004	Socorro	LINEAR	HYG	5.4 km	MPC · JPL
175106	2004 KJ_{11}	—	May 19, 2004	Campo Imperatore	CINEOS	·	3.8 km	MPC · JPL
175107	2004 KB_{16}	—	May 24, 2004	Socorro	LINEAR	·	3.7 km	MPC · JPL
175108	2004 LX_{10}	—	June 9, 2004	Siding Spring	SSS	·	3.0 km	MPC · JPL
175109 Sharickaer	2004 MN_{7}	Sharickaer	June 25, 2004	Wrightwood	Vale, M.	·	5.2 km	MPC · JPL
175110	2004 NF_{9}	—	July 9, 2004	Socorro	LINEAR	·	4.1 km	MPC · JPL
175111	2004 NR_{18}	—	July 14, 2004	Socorro	LINEAR	·	3.0 km	MPC · JPL
175112	2004 PP_{32}	—	August 8, 2004	Socorro	LINEAR	·	3.7 km	MPC · JPL
175113	2004 PF_{115}	—	August 7, 2004	Palomar	M. E. Brown, C. A. Trujillo, D. L. Rabinowitz	other TNO	468 km	MPC · JPL
175114	2004 QQ	—	August 17, 2004	Socorro	LINEAR	APO +1km	1.6 km	MPC · JPL
175115	2004 RH_{157}	—	September 10, 2004	Socorro	LINEAR	HIL · 3:2	10 km	MPC · JPL
175116	2004 RL_{252}	—	September 15, 2004	Socorro	LINEAR	H	980 m	MPC · JPL
175117	2004 SE_{2}	—	September 16, 2004	Kitt Peak	Spacewatch	3:2	9.7 km	MPC · JPL
175118	2004 TU_{214}	—	October 9, 2004	Kitt Peak	Spacewatch	BAP	2.0 km	MPC · JPL
175119	2004 UE_{9}	—	October 23, 2004	Socorro	LINEAR	H	1.0 km	MPC · JPL
175120	2004 XJ_{2}	—	December 1, 2004	Palomar	NEAT	·	1.2 km	MPC · JPL
175121	2004 XX_{30}	—	December 11, 2004	Socorro	LINEAR	H	1.0 km	MPC · JPL
175122	2004 XM_{168}	—	December 7, 2004	Socorro	LINEAR	H	910 m	MPC · JPL
175123	2004 YY_{21}	—	December 18, 2004	Mount Lemmon	Mount Lemmon Survey	·	1.2 km	MPC · JPL
175124	2005 AB_{10}	—	January 7, 2005	Socorro	LINEAR	PHO	2.3 km	MPC · JPL
175125	2005 AA_{35}	—	January 13, 2005	Socorro	LINEAR	·	1.1 km	MPC · JPL
175126	2005 AM_{44}	—	January 15, 2005	Kitt Peak	Spacewatch	·	2.1 km	MPC · JPL
175127	2005 AH_{56}	—	January 15, 2005	Socorro	LINEAR	·	890 m	MPC · JPL
175128	2005 AW_{71}	—	January 15, 2005	Kitt Peak	Spacewatch	·	1.1 km	MPC · JPL
175129	2005 BJ_{19}	—	January 16, 2005	Socorro	LINEAR	L5	17 km	MPC · JPL
175130	2005 CR_{4}	—	February 1, 2005	Kitt Peak	Spacewatch	·	1.0 km	MPC · JPL
175131	2005 CK_{11}	—	February 1, 2005	Kitt Peak	Spacewatch	·	1.8 km	MPC · JPL
175132	2005 CG_{16}	—	February 2, 2005	Socorro	LINEAR	·	6.1 km	MPC · JPL
175133	2005 CV_{49}	—	February 2, 2005	Catalina	CSS	·	1.3 km	MPC · JPL
175134	2005 CM_{56}	—	February 7, 2005	Bergisch Gladbach	W. Bickel	·	920 m	MPC · JPL
175135	2005 CF_{71}	—	February 1, 2005	Kitt Peak	Spacewatch	·	1.0 km	MPC · JPL
175136	2005 DY_{1}	—	February 28, 2005	Goodricke-Pigott	R. A. Tucker	·	1.9 km	MPC · JPL
175137	2005 EP_{6}	—	March 1, 2005	Kitt Peak	Spacewatch	·	1.5 km	MPC · JPL
175138	2005 ET_{7}	—	March 1, 2005	Kitt Peak	Spacewatch	·	2.4 km	MPC · JPL
175139	2005 EM_{9}	—	March 2, 2005	Kitt Peak	Spacewatch	·	1.2 km	MPC · JPL
175140	2005 EM_{10}	—	March 2, 2005	Kitt Peak	Spacewatch	·	3.7 km	MPC · JPL
175141	2005 ES_{13}	—	March 3, 2005	Kitt Peak	Spacewatch	·	1.1 km	MPC · JPL
175142	2005 EG_{14}	—	March 3, 2005	Kitt Peak	Spacewatch	·	1.1 km	MPC · JPL
175143	2005 EG_{15}	—	March 3, 2005	Kitt Peak	Spacewatch	·	2.1 km	MPC · JPL
175144	2005 EX_{16}	—	March 3, 2005	Kitt Peak	Spacewatch	·	870 m	MPC · JPL
175145	2005 EU_{20}	—	March 3, 2005	Catalina	CSS	·	1.9 km	MPC · JPL
175146	2005 ES_{24}	—	March 3, 2005	Catalina	CSS	·	1.2 km	MPC · JPL
175147	2005 EN_{25}	—	March 3, 2005	Catalina	CSS	V	1.0 km	MPC · JPL
175148	2005 EY_{30}	—	March 1, 2005	Needville	Dillon, W. G.	·	1.3 km	MPC · JPL
175149	2005 EW_{32}	—	March 3, 2005	Catalina	CSS	·	1.2 km	MPC · JPL
175150	2005 EZ_{32}	—	March 4, 2005	Kitt Peak	Spacewatch	NYS	1.3 km	MPC · JPL
175151	2005 EO_{34}	—	March 3, 2005	Catalina	CSS	·	1.2 km	MPC · JPL
175152 Marthafarkas	2005 ET_{37}	Marthafarkas	March 3, 2005	Jarnac	Glinos, T., D. H. Levy	V	1.1 km	MPC · JPL
175153	2005 EL_{38}	—	March 3, 2005	Catalina	CSS	·	1.3 km	MPC · JPL
175154	2005 EH_{47}	—	March 3, 2005	Kitt Peak	Spacewatch	NYS	1.5 km	MPC · JPL
175155	2005 EX_{54}	—	March 4, 2005	Kitt Peak	Spacewatch	NYS	1.8 km	MPC · JPL
175156	2005 EU_{60}	—	March 4, 2005	Catalina	CSS	·	960 m	MPC · JPL
175157	2005 EC_{61}	—	March 4, 2005	Catalina	CSS	·	1.0 km	MPC · JPL
175158	2005 EM_{66}	—	March 4, 2005	Catalina	CSS	·	2.2 km	MPC · JPL
175159	2005 EE_{68}	—	March 7, 2005	Socorro	LINEAR	·	1.1 km	MPC · JPL
175160	2005 ES_{68}	—	March 7, 2005	Socorro	LINEAR	·	1.5 km	MPC · JPL
175161	2005 ES_{71}	—	March 2, 2005	Catalina	CSS	V	1.1 km	MPC · JPL
175162	2005 EX_{79}	—	March 3, 2005	Catalina	CSS	·	1.8 km	MPC · JPL
175163	2005 EM_{86}	—	March 4, 2005	Socorro	LINEAR	V	900 m	MPC · JPL
175164	2005 EN_{86}	—	March 4, 2005	Socorro	LINEAR	·	1.1 km	MPC · JPL
175165	2005 EO_{86}	—	March 4, 2005	Socorro	LINEAR	·	1.3 km	MPC · JPL
175166 Adirondack	2005 EZ_{99}	Adirondack	March 3, 2005	Jarnac	Jarnac	·	1.6 km	MPC · JPL
175167	2005 EB_{102}	—	March 3, 2005	Catalina	CSS	·	1.3 km	MPC · JPL
175168	2005 EQ_{118}	—	March 7, 2005	Socorro	LINEAR	·	1.4 km	MPC · JPL
175169	2005 ES_{119}	—	March 7, 2005	Siding Spring	SSS	·	1.6 km	MPC · JPL
175170	2005 EG_{129}	—	March 9, 2005	Anderson Mesa	LONEOS	·	860 m	MPC · JPL
175171	2005 EN_{136}	—	March 9, 2005	Socorro	LINEAR	·	1.0 km	MPC · JPL
175172	2005 EU_{138}	—	March 9, 2005	Mount Lemmon	Mount Lemmon Survey	·	830 m	MPC · JPL
175173	2005 EJ_{139}	—	March 9, 2005	Mount Lemmon	Mount Lemmon Survey	·	3.9 km	MPC · JPL
175174	2005 EA_{141}	—	March 10, 2005	Catalina	CSS	V	870 m	MPC · JPL
175175	2005 EP_{142}	—	March 10, 2005	Catalina	CSS	·	1.6 km	MPC · JPL
175176	2005 EU_{144}	—	March 10, 2005	Mount Lemmon	Mount Lemmon Survey	KOR	2.1 km	MPC · JPL
175177	2005 EQ_{153}	—	March 9, 2005	Catalina	CSS	(194)	2.8 km	MPC · JPL
175178	2005 EQ_{154}	—	March 8, 2005	Mount Lemmon	Mount Lemmon Survey	·	970 m	MPC · JPL
175179	2005 EC_{160}	—	March 9, 2005	Mount Lemmon	Mount Lemmon Survey	V	980 m	MPC · JPL
175180	2005 EZ_{161}	—	March 9, 2005	Mount Lemmon	Mount Lemmon Survey	·	1.0 km	MPC · JPL
175181	2005 ET_{162}	—	March 10, 2005	Mount Lemmon	Mount Lemmon Survey	·	2.5 km	MPC · JPL
175182	2005 EE_{176}	—	March 8, 2005	Anderson Mesa	LONEOS	·	1.5 km	MPC · JPL
175183	2005 EO_{176}	—	March 8, 2005	Mount Lemmon	Mount Lemmon Survey	·	2.6 km	MPC · JPL
175184	2005 EJ_{177}	—	March 8, 2005	Mount Lemmon	Mount Lemmon Survey	·	1.7 km	MPC · JPL
175185	2005 ED_{202}	—	March 8, 2005	Socorro	LINEAR	PHO	4.1 km	MPC · JPL
175186	2005 EC_{211}	—	March 4, 2005	Catalina	CSS	·	2.3 km	MPC · JPL
175187	2005 EC_{214}	—	March 7, 2005	Socorro	LINEAR	·	1.2 km	MPC · JPL
175188	2005 EL_{216}	—	March 8, 2005	Mount Lemmon	Mount Lemmon Survey	MAS	750 m	MPC · JPL
175189	2005 EC_{224}	—	March 11, 2005	Mount Lemmon	Mount Lemmon Survey	AMO +1km	780 m	MPC · JPL
175190	2005 EX_{233}	—	March 10, 2005	Anderson Mesa	LONEOS	V	940 m	MPC · JPL
175191	2005 EL_{241}	—	March 11, 2005	Catalina	CSS	·	1.2 km	MPC · JPL
175192	2005 EM_{242}	—	March 11, 2005	Catalina	CSS	·	1.5 km	MPC · JPL
175193	2005 EK_{243}	—	March 11, 2005	Catalina	CSS	·	1.9 km	MPC · JPL
175194	2005 EL_{268}	—	March 14, 2005	Mount Lemmon	Mount Lemmon Survey	PHO	4.9 km	MPC · JPL
175195	2005 EG_{270}	—	March 12, 2005	Socorro	LINEAR	V	990 m	MPC · JPL
175196	2005 EM_{276}	—	March 8, 2005	Socorro	LINEAR	·	2.8 km	MPC · JPL
175197	2005 ED_{288}	—	March 8, 2005	Kitt Peak	Spacewatch	·	1.2 km	MPC · JPL
175198	2005 EQ_{290}	—	March 10, 2005	Catalina	CSS	·	1.2 km	MPC · JPL
175199	2005 ER_{305}	—	March 10, 2005	Calvin-Rehoboth	Calvin College	·	810 m	MPC · JPL
175200	2005 EV_{315}	—	March 11, 2005	Kitt Peak	Spacewatch	MAS	1.3 km	MPC · JPL

== 175201–175300 ==
back to top

Designation			Discovery			Properties		Ref
Permanent	Provisional	Named after	Date	Site	Discoverer(s)	Category	Diam.	Ref
175201	2005 EZ_{323}	—	March 13, 2005	Anderson Mesa	LONEOS	·	4.0 km	MPC · JPL
175202	2005 FV_{1}	—	March 16, 2005	Mount Lemmon	Mount Lemmon Survey	·	810 m	MPC · JPL
175203 Kingston	2005 FS_{4}	Kingston	March 31, 2005	Jarnac	Jarnac	V	1.0 km	MPC · JPL
175204 Gregbyrne	2005 FT_{5}	Gregbyrne	March 31, 2005	Goodricke-Pigott	Reddy, V.	GEF	2.6 km	MPC · JPL
175205	2005 GP_{2}	—	April 1, 2005	Kitt Peak	Spacewatch	·	1.2 km	MPC · JPL
175206	2005 GS_{7}	—	April 1, 2005	Anderson Mesa	LONEOS	NAE	4.7 km	MPC · JPL
175207	2005 GR_{13}	—	April 1, 2005	Anderson Mesa	LONEOS	EOS	3.6 km	MPC · JPL
175208 Vorbourg	2005 GA_{14}	Vorbourg	April 1, 2005	Vicques	M. Ory	·	1.3 km	MPC · JPL
175209	2005 GD_{28}	—	April 3, 2005	Palomar	NEAT	·	1.0 km	MPC · JPL
175210	2005 GE_{28}	—	April 3, 2005	Siding Spring	SSS	·	1.2 km	MPC · JPL
175211	2005 GR_{28}	—	April 4, 2005	Kitt Peak	Spacewatch	·	2.4 km	MPC · JPL
175212	2005 GD_{30}	—	April 4, 2005	Catalina	CSS	·	1.2 km	MPC · JPL
175213	2005 GS_{32}	—	April 4, 2005	Socorro	LINEAR	·	1.2 km	MPC · JPL
175214	2005 GN_{33}	—	April 5, 2005	Catalina	CSS	·	1.4 km	MPC · JPL
175215	2005 GT_{38}	—	April 4, 2005	Catalina	CSS	·	1.3 km	MPC · JPL
175216	2005 GR_{51}	—	April 2, 2005	Palomar	NEAT	·	1.3 km	MPC · JPL
175217	2005 GA_{59}	—	April 4, 2005	Catalina	CSS	·	2.2 km	MPC · JPL
175218	2005 GX_{62}	—	April 2, 2005	Catalina	CSS	·	1.8 km	MPC · JPL
175219	2005 GY_{64}	—	April 2, 2005	Catalina	CSS	·	2.2 km	MPC · JPL
175220	2005 GM_{77}	—	April 6, 2005	Catalina	CSS	·	1.4 km	MPC · JPL
175221	2005 GF_{80}	—	April 7, 2005	Kitt Peak	Spacewatch	·	1.2 km	MPC · JPL
175222	2005 GZ_{80}	—	April 7, 2005	Kitt Peak	Spacewatch	·	1.8 km	MPC · JPL
175223	2005 GA_{102}	—	April 9, 2005	Socorro	LINEAR	NYS	1.7 km	MPC · JPL
175224	2005 GN_{104}	—	April 10, 2005	Kitt Peak	Spacewatch	·	1.1 km	MPC · JPL
175225	2005 GE_{111}	—	April 10, 2005	Goodricke-Pigott	R. A. Tucker	·	2.3 km	MPC · JPL
175226	2005 GS_{111}	—	April 5, 2005	Mount Lemmon	Mount Lemmon Survey	·	1.1 km	MPC · JPL
175227	2005 GL_{112}	—	April 6, 2005	Catalina	CSS	·	2.9 km	MPC · JPL
175228	2005 GO_{121}	—	April 5, 2005	Kitt Peak	Spacewatch	·	1.9 km	MPC · JPL
175229	2005 GJ_{126}	—	April 11, 2005	Socorro	LINEAR	·	1.7 km	MPC · JPL
175230	2005 GA_{131}	—	April 9, 2005	Kitt Peak	Spacewatch	·	3.0 km	MPC · JPL
175231	2005 GL_{150}	—	April 11, 2005	Kitt Peak	Spacewatch	·	1.8 km	MPC · JPL
175232	2005 GE_{152}	—	April 12, 2005	Kitt Peak	Spacewatch	·	1.1 km	MPC · JPL
175233	2005 GP_{162}	—	April 7, 2005	Anderson Mesa	LONEOS	·	4.1 km	MPC · JPL
175234	2005 GG_{164}	—	April 10, 2005	Mount Lemmon	Mount Lemmon Survey	·	2.6 km	MPC · JPL
175235	2005 GU_{165}	—	April 11, 2005	Anderson Mesa	LONEOS	·	1.5 km	MPC · JPL
175236	2005 GF_{179}	—	April 13, 2005	Catalina	CSS	·	1.4 km	MPC · JPL
175237	2005 GC_{182}	—	April 13, 2005	Kitt Peak	Spacewatch	·	3.4 km	MPC · JPL
175238 Nguyenhien	2005 GK_{187}	Nguyenhien	April 12, 2005	Kitt Peak	M. W. Buie	MAS	1.1 km	MPC · JPL
175239	2005 GA_{213}	—	April 4, 2005	Catalina	CSS	·	1.6 km	MPC · JPL
175240	2005 GC_{215}	—	April 14, 2005	Catalina	CSS	·	2.2 km	MPC · JPL
175241	2005 HQ	—	April 16, 2005	Kitt Peak	Spacewatch	·	1.6 km	MPC · JPL
175242	2005 HP_{3}	—	April 17, 2005	Siding Spring	SSS	·	4.2 km	MPC · JPL
175243	2005 JQ_{14}	—	May 1, 2005	Kitt Peak	Spacewatch	PHO	1.4 km	MPC · JPL
175244	2005 JC_{15}	—	May 2, 2005	Kitt Peak	Spacewatch	·	1.8 km	MPC · JPL
175245	2005 JZ_{15}	—	May 3, 2005	Kitt Peak	Spacewatch	·	1.2 km	MPC · JPL
175246	2005 JS_{17}	—	May 4, 2005	Kitt Peak	Spacewatch	V	1.0 km	MPC · JPL
175247	2005 JS_{21}	—	May 4, 2005	Siding Spring	SSS	·	940 m	MPC · JPL
175248	2005 JF_{26}	—	May 3, 2005	Kitt Peak	Spacewatch	·	1.1 km	MPC · JPL
175249	2005 JE_{28}	—	May 3, 2005	Socorro	LINEAR	·	1.9 km	MPC · JPL
175250	2005 JS_{29}	—	May 3, 2005	Socorro	LINEAR	GEF	2.2 km	MPC · JPL
175251	2005 JQ_{30}	—	May 4, 2005	Palomar	NEAT	V	1.0 km	MPC · JPL
175252	2005 JE_{48}	—	May 3, 2005	Kitt Peak	Spacewatch	·	2.4 km	MPC · JPL
175253	2005 JF_{51}	—	May 4, 2005	Kitt Peak	Spacewatch	·	1.8 km	MPC · JPL
175254	2005 JO_{51}	—	May 4, 2005	Kitt Peak	Spacewatch	·	4.1 km	MPC · JPL
175255	2005 JH_{64}	—	May 11, 2005	RAS	Lowe, A.	V	900 m	MPC · JPL
175256	2005 JH_{67}	—	May 4, 2005	Catalina	CSS	·	4.4 km	MPC · JPL
175257	2005 JD_{82}	—	May 12, 2005	RAS	Lowe, A.	·	2.1 km	MPC · JPL
175258	2005 JL_{83}	—	May 8, 2005	Kitt Peak	Spacewatch	MAS	870 m	MPC · JPL
175259 Offenberger	2005 JH_{91}	Offenberger	May 10, 2005	Saint-Sulpice	B. Christophe	LIX	5.9 km	MPC · JPL
175260	2005 JS_{93}	—	May 11, 2005	Palomar	NEAT	·	1.8 km	MPC · JPL
175261	2005 JY_{100}	—	May 9, 2005	Catalina	CSS	MAR	1.7 km	MPC · JPL
175262	2005 JE_{102}	—	May 9, 2005	Kitt Peak	Spacewatch	·	2.4 km	MPC · JPL
175263	2005 JG_{112}	—	May 9, 2005	Kitt Peak	Spacewatch	·	2.0 km	MPC · JPL
175264	2005 JK_{112}	—	May 9, 2005	Catalina	CSS	·	1.9 km	MPC · JPL
175265	2005 JU_{114}	—	May 10, 2005	Mount Lemmon	Mount Lemmon Survey	·	1.4 km	MPC · JPL
175266	2005 JY_{127}	—	May 12, 2005	Socorro	LINEAR	·	2.6 km	MPC · JPL
175267	2005 JF_{136}	—	May 11, 2005	Catalina	CSS	·	2.9 km	MPC · JPL
175268	2005 JP_{140}	—	May 14, 2005	Socorro	LINEAR	·	4.0 km	MPC · JPL
175269	2005 JU_{144}	—	May 15, 2005	Mount Lemmon	Mount Lemmon Survey	MAS	1 km	MPC · JPL
175270	2005 JL_{145}	—	May 15, 2005	Mount Lemmon	Mount Lemmon Survey	NYS	1.7 km	MPC · JPL
175271	2005 JY_{145}	—	May 12, 2005	Palomar	NEAT	·	1.7 km	MPC · JPL
175272	2005 JP_{157}	—	May 4, 2005	Palomar	NEAT	·	3.4 km	MPC · JPL
175273	2005 JN_{158}	—	May 6, 2005	Catalina	CSS	·	980 m	MPC · JPL
175274	2005 JA_{159}	—	May 7, 2005	Kitt Peak	Spacewatch	·	1.4 km	MPC · JPL
175275	2005 JE_{178}	—	May 10, 2005	Mount Lemmon	Mount Lemmon Survey	·	2.6 km	MPC · JPL
175276	2005 JD_{179}	—	May 14, 2005	Palomar	NEAT	·	3.4 km	MPC · JPL
175277	2005 JB_{180}	—	May 7, 2005	Catalina	CSS	·	4.3 km	MPC · JPL
175278	2005 KM_{3}	—	May 17, 2005	Mount Lemmon	Mount Lemmon Survey	·	2.4 km	MPC · JPL
175279	2005 KL_{6}	—	May 18, 2005	Palomar	NEAT	·	2.1 km	MPC · JPL
175280	2005 KZ_{6}	—	May 19, 2005	Siding Spring	SSS	V	1.2 km	MPC · JPL
175281 Kolonics	2005 KG_{9}	Kolonics	May 28, 2005	Piszkéstető	K. Sárneczky	EOS	2.4 km	MPC · JPL
175282 Benhida	2005 LA	Benhida	June 1, 2005	Vicques	M. Ory	·	2.7 km	MPC · JPL
175283	2005 LJ	—	June 1, 2005	Mount Lemmon	Mount Lemmon Survey	·	2.2 km	MPC · JPL
175284	2005 LP_{2}	—	June 2, 2005	Catalina	CSS	·	2.2 km	MPC · JPL
175285	2005 LX_{3}	—	June 3, 2005	Reedy Creek	J. Broughton	·	3.1 km	MPC · JPL
175286	2005 LL_{9}	—	June 1, 2005	Kitt Peak	Spacewatch	NYS	1.5 km	MPC · JPL
175287	2005 LM_{11}	—	June 3, 2005	Kitt Peak	Spacewatch	·	3.8 km	MPC · JPL
175288	2005 LD_{12}	—	June 4, 2005	Catalina	CSS	NYS	1.2 km	MPC · JPL
175289	2005 LX_{20}	—	June 5, 2005	Kitt Peak	Spacewatch	·	2.8 km	MPC · JPL
175290	2005 LK_{21}	—	June 6, 2005	Kitt Peak	Spacewatch	MAS	920 m	MPC · JPL
175291	2005 LF_{22}	—	June 8, 2005	Kitt Peak	Spacewatch	(5)	1.4 km	MPC · JPL
175292	2005 LY_{22}	—	June 8, 2005	Kitt Peak	Spacewatch	THM	3.9 km	MPC · JPL
175293	2005 LD_{23}	—	June 8, 2005	Kitt Peak	Spacewatch	GEF	2.1 km	MPC · JPL
175294	2005 LR_{26}	—	June 8, 2005	Kitt Peak	Spacewatch	·	2.3 km	MPC · JPL
175295	2005 LW_{27}	—	June 9, 2005	Kitt Peak	Spacewatch	·	3.2 km	MPC · JPL
175296	2005 LG_{30}	—	June 12, 2005	Kitt Peak	Spacewatch	·	3.7 km	MPC · JPL
175297	2005 LL_{35}	—	June 10, 2005	Kitt Peak	Spacewatch	·	1.5 km	MPC · JPL
175298	2005 LK_{37}	—	June 11, 2005	Kitt Peak	Spacewatch	·	1.8 km	MPC · JPL
175299	2005 LR_{42}	—	June 14, 2005	Kitt Peak	Spacewatch	·	1.4 km	MPC · JPL
175300	2005 LD_{44}	—	June 11, 2005	Catalina	CSS	EUP	7.9 km	MPC · JPL

== 175301–175400 ==
back to top

Designation			Discovery			Properties		Ref
Permanent	Provisional	Named after	Date	Site	Discoverer(s)	Category	Diam.	Ref
175301 Mathur	2005 LC_{47}	Mathur	June 13, 2005	Mount Lemmon	Mount Lemmon Survey	·	6.9 km	MPC · JPL
175302	2005 LU_{48}	—	June 10, 2005	Kitt Peak	Spacewatch	·	1.6 km	MPC · JPL
175303	2005 LL_{50}	—	June 13, 2005	Mount Lemmon	Mount Lemmon Survey	·	1.8 km	MPC · JPL
175304	2005 MC_{3}	—	June 21, 2005	Palomar	NEAT	·	4.5 km	MPC · JPL
175305	2005 MM_{3}	—	June 24, 2005	Palomar	NEAT	slow	1.9 km	MPC · JPL
175306	2005 MC_{6}	—	June 24, 2005	Palomar	NEAT	GEF	1.8 km	MPC · JPL
175307	2005 MR_{6}	—	June 26, 2005	Mount Lemmon	Mount Lemmon Survey	·	2.4 km	MPC · JPL
175308	2005 ME_{7}	—	June 27, 2005	Mount Lemmon	Mount Lemmon Survey	MAS	1.1 km	MPC · JPL
175309	2005 MK_{7}	—	June 27, 2005	Mount Lemmon	Mount Lemmon Survey	MAS	1.1 km	MPC · JPL
175310	2005 MA_{10}	—	June 23, 2005	Palomar	NEAT	·	3.9 km	MPC · JPL
175311	2005 MO_{10}	—	June 27, 2005	Kitt Peak	Spacewatch	·	3.0 km	MPC · JPL
175312	2005 MW_{11}	—	June 27, 2005	Kitt Peak	Spacewatch	·	3.2 km	MPC · JPL
175313	2005 MF_{15}	—	June 29, 2005	Palomar	NEAT	·	5.2 km	MPC · JPL
175314	2005 MN_{15}	—	June 29, 2005	Palomar	NEAT	·	2.8 km	MPC · JPL
175315	2005 ME_{19}	—	June 29, 2005	Kitt Peak	Spacewatch	·	1.1 km	MPC · JPL
175316	2005 MO_{24}	—	June 30, 2005	Kitt Peak	Spacewatch	·	4.1 km	MPC · JPL
175317	2005 MT_{24}	—	June 23, 2005	Palomar	NEAT	·	2.2 km	MPC · JPL
175318	2005 MF_{26}	—	June 28, 2005	Kitt Peak	Spacewatch	·	2.4 km	MPC · JPL
175319	2005 ML_{32}	—	June 28, 2005	Palomar	NEAT	·	4.3 km	MPC · JPL
175320	2005 MC_{35}	—	June 30, 2005	Kitt Peak	Spacewatch	EOS	2.5 km	MPC · JPL
175321	2005 MQ_{35}	—	June 30, 2005	Kitt Peak	Spacewatch	AGN	1.7 km	MPC · JPL
175322	2005 MV_{37}	—	June 30, 2005	Kitt Peak	Spacewatch	KOR	1.8 km	MPC · JPL
175323	2005 MZ_{37}	—	June 30, 2005	Palomar	NEAT	·	3.1 km	MPC · JPL
175324	2005 MR_{39}	—	June 29, 2005	Palomar	NEAT	·	4.3 km	MPC · JPL
175325	2005 NP_{3}	—	July 1, 2005	Kitt Peak	Spacewatch	·	4.5 km	MPC · JPL
175326	2005 NC_{5}	—	July 3, 2005	Mount Lemmon	Mount Lemmon Survey	·	2.8 km	MPC · JPL
175327	2005 NK_{6}	—	July 4, 2005	Mount Lemmon	Mount Lemmon Survey	·	3.4 km	MPC · JPL
175328	2005 NL_{16}	—	July 2, 2005	Kitt Peak	Spacewatch	·	5.8 km	MPC · JPL
175329	2005 NQ_{24}	—	July 4, 2005	Mount Lemmon	Mount Lemmon Survey	·	3.1 km	MPC · JPL
175330	2005 NX_{32}	—	July 5, 2005	Kitt Peak	Spacewatch	·	4.7 km	MPC · JPL
175331	2005 NW_{33}	—	July 5, 2005	Kitt Peak	Spacewatch	·	2.3 km	MPC · JPL
175332	2005 NB_{35}	—	July 5, 2005	Kitt Peak	Spacewatch	·	1.9 km	MPC · JPL
175333	2005 NQ_{36}	—	July 6, 2005	Kitt Peak	Spacewatch	AGN	1.9 km	MPC · JPL
175334	2005 NZ_{37}	—	July 6, 2005	Kitt Peak	Spacewatch	·	3.9 km	MPC · JPL
175335	2005 NL_{39}	—	July 7, 2005	Reedy Creek	J. Broughton	EOS	3.5 km	MPC · JPL
175336	2005 NU_{40}	—	July 3, 2005	Mount Lemmon	Mount Lemmon Survey	·	2.5 km	MPC · JPL
175337	2005 NZ_{45}	—	July 5, 2005	Mount Lemmon	Mount Lemmon Survey	·	3.0 km	MPC · JPL
175338	2005 NA_{59}	—	July 9, 2005	Kitt Peak	Spacewatch	·	2.8 km	MPC · JPL
175339	2005 NC_{67}	—	July 2, 2005	Kitt Peak	Spacewatch	·	2.1 km	MPC · JPL
175340	2005 NX_{70}	—	July 5, 2005	Palomar	NEAT	·	2.2 km	MPC · JPL
175341	2005 NK_{74}	—	July 9, 2005	Kitt Peak	Spacewatch	KOR	1.8 km	MPC · JPL
175342	2005 NS_{80}	—	July 12, 2005	Bergisch Gladbach	W. Bickel	·	2.4 km	MPC · JPL
175343	2005 NU_{87}	—	July 4, 2005	Kitt Peak	Spacewatch	·	2.3 km	MPC · JPL
175344	2005 NJ_{91}	—	July 5, 2005	Mount Lemmon	Mount Lemmon Survey	·	1.7 km	MPC · JPL
175345	2005 NP_{108}	—	July 7, 2005	Mauna Kea	Veillet, C.	·	2.7 km	MPC · JPL
175346	2005 NK_{122}	—	July 12, 2005	Catalina	CSS	EOS	3.8 km	MPC · JPL
175347	2005 NV_{122}	—	July 4, 2005	Palomar	NEAT	VER	5.4 km	MPC · JPL
175348	2005 OO_{2}	—	July 28, 2005	Socorro	LINEAR	·	8.5 km	MPC · JPL
175349	2005 OA_{6}	—	July 28, 2005	Palomar	NEAT	·	3.5 km	MPC · JPL
175350	2005 OM_{7}	—	July 29, 2005	Palomar	NEAT	3:2	9.0 km	MPC · JPL
175351	2005 OR_{7}	—	July 30, 2005	Siding Spring	SSS	T_{j} (2.99) · HIL · 3:2	10 km	MPC · JPL
175352	2005 OO_{8}	—	July 28, 2005	Palomar	NEAT	·	4.5 km	MPC · JPL
175353	2005 OH_{11}	—	July 28, 2005	Palomar	NEAT	·	4.5 km	MPC · JPL
175354	2005 OS_{15}	—	July 29, 2005	Palomar	NEAT	·	6.6 km	MPC · JPL
175355	2005 PR_{19}	—	August 6, 2005	Palomar	NEAT	T_{j} (2.98) · 3:2	7.9 km	MPC · JPL
175356	2005 QK	—	August 24, 2005	Pla D'Arguines	R. Ferrando	·	4.8 km	MPC · JPL
175357	2005 QB_{1}	—	August 22, 2005	Palomar	NEAT	·	3.1 km	MPC · JPL
175358	2005 QT_{26}	—	August 27, 2005	Kitt Peak	Spacewatch	HYG	4.8 km	MPC · JPL
175359	2005 QB_{53}	—	August 28, 2005	Kitt Peak	Spacewatch	·	3.3 km	MPC · JPL
175360	2005 QN_{57}	—	August 24, 2005	Palomar	NEAT	·	4.5 km	MPC · JPL
175361	2005 QM_{61}	—	August 26, 2005	Palomar	NEAT	EOS	3.8 km	MPC · JPL
175362	2005 QD_{101}	—	August 27, 2005	Palomar	NEAT	·	3.6 km	MPC · JPL
175363	2005 QX_{114}	—	August 27, 2005	Palomar	NEAT	THM	4.8 km	MPC · JPL
175364	2005 QY_{122}	—	August 28, 2005	Kitt Peak	Spacewatch	·	2.4 km	MPC · JPL
175365 Carsac	2005 QO_{143}	Carsac	August 31, 2005	Saint-Sulpice	B. Christophe	SYL · CYB	6.2 km	MPC · JPL
175366	2005 QQ_{147}	—	August 28, 2005	Siding Spring	SSS	·	5.9 km	MPC · JPL
175367	2005 QF_{165}	—	August 31, 2005	Palomar	NEAT	HYG	6.5 km	MPC · JPL
175368	2005 RD_{16}	—	September 1, 2005	Kitt Peak	Spacewatch	·	2.9 km	MPC · JPL
175369	2005 RX_{27}	—	September 11, 2005	Socorro	LINEAR	·	3.7 km	MPC · JPL
175370	2005 SH_{116}	—	September 27, 2005	Kitt Peak	Spacewatch	·	4.1 km	MPC · JPL
175371	2005 SP_{165}	—	September 28, 2005	Palomar	NEAT	3:2	7.2 km	MPC · JPL
175372	2005 SM_{201}	—	September 30, 2005	Kitt Peak	Spacewatch	3:2	6.3 km	MPC · JPL
175373	2005 SR_{223}	—	September 29, 2005	Mount Lemmon	Mount Lemmon Survey	THM	3.0 km	MPC · JPL
175374	2005 SX_{243}	—	September 30, 2005	Mount Lemmon	Mount Lemmon Survey	·	2.8 km	MPC · JPL
175375	2005 TY_{18}	—	October 1, 2005	Mount Lemmon	Mount Lemmon Survey	·	4.4 km	MPC · JPL
175376	2005 TT_{71}	—	October 3, 2005	Catalina	CSS	·	4.2 km	MPC · JPL
175377	2005 TA_{108}	—	October 7, 2005	Kitt Peak	Spacewatch	·	4.9 km	MPC · JPL
175378	2005 UN_{114}	—	October 22, 2005	Catalina	CSS	·	5.6 km	MPC · JPL
175379	2005 UE_{495}	—	October 26, 2005	Socorro	LINEAR	·	2.8 km	MPC · JPL
175380	2006 HE_{103}	—	April 30, 2006	Catalina	CSS	·	1.4 km	MPC · JPL
175381	2006 HA_{122}	—	April 30, 2006	Catalina	CSS	·	2.1 km	MPC · JPL
175382	2006 JM_{15}	—	May 2, 2006	Mount Lemmon	Mount Lemmon Survey	NYS · slow	1.6 km	MPC · JPL
175383	2006 JQ_{44}	—	May 6, 2006	Kitt Peak	Spacewatch	·	3.2 km	MPC · JPL
175384	2006 KF_{79}	—	May 24, 2006	Mount Lemmon	Mount Lemmon Survey	NYS	1.9 km	MPC · JPL
175385	2006 KA_{101}	—	May 24, 2006	Mount Lemmon	Mount Lemmon Survey	·	2.1 km	MPC · JPL
175386	2006 LN_{4}	—	June 11, 2006	Palomar	NEAT	·	3.2 km	MPC · JPL
175387	2006 LF_{7}	—	June 10, 2006	Palomar	NEAT	·	3.2 km	MPC · JPL
175388	2006 LR_{7}	—	June 7, 2006	Siding Spring	SSS	·	4.2 km	MPC · JPL
175389	2006 MQ_{3}	—	June 19, 2006	Catalina	CSS	MAS	1.5 km	MPC · JPL
175390	2006 MN_{6}	—	June 20, 2006	Kitt Peak	Spacewatch	·	3.0 km	MPC · JPL
175391	2006 MP_{9}	—	June 19, 2006	Kitt Peak	Spacewatch	·	2.3 km	MPC · JPL
175392	2006 MH_{14}	—	June 18, 2006	Siding Spring	SSS	·	3.7 km	MPC · JPL
175393	2006 MM_{14}	—	June 24, 2006	Anderson Mesa	LONEOS	·	4.9 km	MPC · JPL
175394	2006 MD_{15}	—	June 30, 2006	Socorro	LINEAR	·	6.3 km	MPC · JPL
175395	2006 NY	—	July 5, 2006	Siding Spring	SSS	·	2.5 km	MPC · JPL
175396	2006 OH_{2}	—	July 18, 2006	Socorro	LINEAR	·	4.7 km	MPC · JPL
175397 Oumousangaré	2006 OS_{6}	Oumousangaré	July 21, 2006	Mount Lemmon	Mount Lemmon Survey	·	2.1 km	MPC · JPL
175398	2006 OJ_{7}	—	July 18, 2006	Mount Lemmon	Mount Lemmon Survey	·	3.3 km	MPC · JPL
175399	2006 OM_{7}	—	July 18, 2006	Mount Lemmon	Mount Lemmon Survey	NYS	1.7 km	MPC · JPL
175400	2006 OT_{7}	—	July 19, 2006	Palomar	NEAT	ERI	2.4 km	MPC · JPL

== 175401–175500 ==
back to top

Designation			Discovery			Properties		Ref
Permanent	Provisional	Named after	Date	Site	Discoverer(s)	Category	Diam.	Ref
175401	2006 OA_{9}	—	July 20, 2006	Palomar	NEAT	·	1.7 km	MPC · JPL
175402	2006 OL_{10}	—	July 25, 2006	Ottmarsheim	C. Rinner	V	890 m	MPC · JPL
175403	2006 OA_{11}	—	July 19, 2006	Palomar	NEAT	·	1.9 km	MPC · JPL
175404	2006 OV_{11}	—	July 21, 2006	Catalina	CSS	·	3.6 km	MPC · JPL
175405	2006 OL_{12}	—	July 25, 2006	Palomar	NEAT	(2076)	1.1 km	MPC · JPL
175406	2006 OL_{14}	—	July 25, 2006	Palomar	NEAT	·	940 m	MPC · JPL
175407	2006 OH_{16}	—	July 18, 2006	Mount Lemmon	Mount Lemmon Survey	·	4.2 km	MPC · JPL
175408	2006 OZ_{16}	—	July 21, 2006	Mount Lemmon	Mount Lemmon Survey	·	1.5 km	MPC · JPL
175409	2006 OS_{18}	—	July 20, 2006	Siding Spring	SSS	·	2.6 km	MPC · JPL
175410 Tsayweanshun	2006 PB_{8}	Tsayweanshun	August 12, 2006	Lulin Observatory	Lin, H.-C., Q. Ye	·	1.4 km	MPC · JPL
175411 Yilan	2006 PC_{8}	Yilan	August 12, 2006	Lulin Observatory	Lin, H.-C., Q. Ye	·	2.1 km	MPC · JPL
175412	2006 PA_{9}	—	August 13, 2006	Palomar	NEAT	NYS	1.4 km	MPC · JPL
175413	2006 PH_{9}	—	August 13, 2006	Palomar	NEAT	NYS	1.9 km	MPC · JPL
175414	2006 PF_{11}	—	August 13, 2006	Palomar	NEAT	·	1.7 km	MPC · JPL
175415	2006 PS_{12}	—	August 13, 2006	Palomar	NEAT	NYS	1.9 km	MPC · JPL
175416	2006 PA_{14}	—	August 14, 2006	Siding Spring	SSS	·	1.8 km	MPC · JPL
175417	2006 PU_{14}	—	August 15, 2006	Palomar	NEAT	·	2.3 km	MPC · JPL
175418	2006 PP_{15}	—	August 15, 2006	Palomar	NEAT	THM	3.7 km	MPC · JPL
175419 Albiesachs	2006 PN_{17}	Albiesachs	August 15, 2006	Lulin Observatory	Lin, C.-S., Q. Ye	HYG	3.6 km	MPC · JPL
175420	2006 PT_{20}	—	August 15, 2006	Palomar	NEAT	·	2.3 km	MPC · JPL
175421	2006 PB_{22}	—	August 15, 2006	Palomar	NEAT	NYS	2.4 km	MPC · JPL
175422	2006 PY_{23}	—	August 12, 2006	Palomar	NEAT	·	1.5 km	MPC · JPL
175423	2006 PO_{26}	—	August 15, 2006	Palomar	NEAT	NYS	1.6 km	MPC · JPL
175424	2006 PY_{29}	—	August 12, 2006	Palomar	NEAT	V	1.0 km	MPC · JPL
175425	2006 PF_{30}	—	August 6, 2006	Anderson Mesa	LONEOS	·	3.3 km	MPC · JPL
175426	2006 PC_{32}	—	August 15, 2006	Palomar	NEAT	WIT	1.5 km	MPC · JPL
175427	2006 QN_{3}	—	August 18, 2006	Socorro	LINEAR	·	2.9 km	MPC · JPL
175428	2006 QW_{8}	—	August 19, 2006	Kitt Peak	Spacewatch	·	4.1 km	MPC · JPL
175429	2006 QC_{10}	—	August 20, 2006	Kitt Peak	Spacewatch	·	4.5 km	MPC · JPL
175430	2006 QU_{16}	—	August 17, 2006	Palomar	NEAT	MAS	1.7 km	MPC · JPL
175431	2006 QS_{20}	—	August 18, 2006	Anderson Mesa	LONEOS	BAP	1.2 km	MPC · JPL
175432	2006 QP_{25}	—	August 18, 2006	Kitt Peak	Spacewatch	·	2.0 km	MPC · JPL
175433	2006 QS_{25}	—	August 18, 2006	Kitt Peak	Spacewatch	·	4.6 km	MPC · JPL
175434	2006 QV_{26}	—	August 19, 2006	Anderson Mesa	LONEOS	(5)	1.4 km	MPC · JPL
175435	2006 QV_{29}	—	August 17, 2006	Palomar	NEAT	·	2.2 km	MPC · JPL
175436	2006 QW_{29}	—	August 19, 2006	Palomar	NEAT	·	1.2 km	MPC · JPL
175437 Zsivótzky	2006 QJ_{31}	Zsivótzky	August 21, 2006	Piszkéstető	K. Sárneczky, Kuli, Z.	DOR	3.7 km	MPC · JPL
175438	2006 QX_{31}	—	August 18, 2006	Anderson Mesa	LONEOS	·	1.6 km	MPC · JPL
175439	2006 QJ_{32}	—	August 19, 2006	Palomar	NEAT	·	3.7 km	MPC · JPL
175440	2006 QR_{32}	—	August 21, 2006	Kitt Peak	Spacewatch	·	5.7 km	MPC · JPL
175441	2006 QH_{41}	—	August 17, 2006	Palomar	NEAT	·	6.6 km	MPC · JPL
175442	2006 QU_{43}	—	August 19, 2006	Palomar	NEAT	·	2.5 km	MPC · JPL
175443	2006 QR_{45}	—	August 19, 2006	Anderson Mesa	LONEOS	NYS	1.9 km	MPC · JPL
175444	2006 QY_{47}	—	August 21, 2006	Socorro	LINEAR	PHO	3.3 km	MPC · JPL
175445	2006 QO_{48}	—	August 21, 2006	Socorro	LINEAR	·	3.8 km	MPC · JPL
175446	2006 QJ_{49}	—	August 21, 2006	Palomar	NEAT	·	2.3 km	MPC · JPL
175447	2006 QP_{49}	—	August 22, 2006	Palomar	NEAT	V	1.2 km	MPC · JPL
175448	2006 QY_{50}	—	August 22, 2006	Palomar	NEAT	·	2.9 km	MPC · JPL
175449	2006 QG_{58}	—	August 17, 2006	Goodricke-Pigott	R. A. Tucker	·	2.0 km	MPC · JPL
175450 Phillipklu	2006 QN_{58}	Phillipklu	August 27, 2006	Lulin Observatory	Lin, H.-C., Q. Ye	·	1.7 km	MPC · JPL
175451 Linchisheng	2006 QP_{58}	Linchisheng	August 27, 2006	Lulin Observatory	Lin, H.-C., Q. Ye	HYG	4.1 km	MPC · JPL
175452 Chenggong	2006 QR_{58}	Chenggong	August 27, 2006	Lulin Observatory	Lin, H.-C., Q. Ye	·	1.1 km	MPC · JPL
175453	2006 QU_{61}	—	August 22, 2006	Palomar	NEAT	EUP	6.1 km	MPC · JPL
175454	2006 QY_{62}	—	August 24, 2006	Socorro	LINEAR	V	1.1 km	MPC · JPL
175455	2006 QG_{84}	—	August 27, 2006	Kitt Peak	Spacewatch	·	3.0 km	MPC · JPL
175456	2006 QD_{85}	—	August 27, 2006	Kitt Peak	Spacewatch	·	1.8 km	MPC · JPL
175457	2006 QO_{85}	—	August 27, 2006	Kitt Peak	Spacewatch	·	1.7 km	MPC · JPL
175458	2006 QF_{90}	—	August 17, 2006	Palomar	NEAT	V	1.1 km	MPC · JPL
175459	2006 QH_{92}	—	August 16, 2006	Palomar	NEAT	·	1.8 km	MPC · JPL
175460	2006 QV_{93}	—	August 16, 2006	Palomar	NEAT	T_{j} (2.96)	5.0 km	MPC · JPL
175461	2006 QE_{96}	—	August 16, 2006	Palomar	NEAT	·	2.3 km	MPC · JPL
175462	2006 QC_{99}	—	August 23, 2006	Socorro	LINEAR	V	1.1 km	MPC · JPL
175463	2006 QA_{101}	—	August 26, 2006	Socorro	LINEAR	·	6.6 km	MPC · JPL
175464	2006 QS_{111}	—	August 21, 2006	Kitt Peak	Spacewatch	·	3.7 km	MPC · JPL
175465	2006 QT_{114}	—	August 27, 2006	Anderson Mesa	LONEOS	·	2.5 km	MPC · JPL
175466	2006 QA_{116}	—	August 27, 2006	Anderson Mesa	LONEOS	·	3.4 km	MPC · JPL
175467	2006 QE_{122}	—	August 29, 2006	Catalina	CSS	·	1.0 km	MPC · JPL
175468	2006 QM_{122}	—	August 29, 2006	Catalina	CSS	·	2.8 km	MPC · JPL
175469	2006 QD_{127}	—	August 16, 2006	Siding Spring	SSS	·	9.1 km	MPC · JPL
175470	2006 QY_{133}	—	August 24, 2006	Palomar	NEAT	·	2.0 km	MPC · JPL
175471	2006 QA_{138}	—	August 16, 2006	Palomar	NEAT	L4	13 km	MPC · JPL
175472	2006 QO_{138}	—	August 16, 2006	Palomar	NEAT	·	2.3 km	MPC · JPL
175473	2006 QU_{148}	—	August 18, 2006	Kitt Peak	Spacewatch	·	1.3 km	MPC · JPL
175474	2006 QC_{149}	—	August 18, 2006	Kitt Peak	Spacewatch	MRX	1.5 km	MPC · JPL
175475	2006 QA_{166}	—	August 29, 2006	Catalina	CSS	·	4.5 km	MPC · JPL
175476 Macheret	2006 RA_{1}	Macheret	September 4, 2006	Marly	P. Kocher	·	2.1 km	MPC · JPL
175477	2006 RG_{6}	—	September 14, 2006	Catalina	CSS	AGN	1.8 km	MPC · JPL
175478	2006 RN_{7}	—	September 12, 2006	Socorro	LINEAR	·	1.3 km	MPC · JPL
175479	2006 RK_{16}	—	September 14, 2006	Palomar	NEAT	EUN	1.7 km	MPC · JPL
175480	2006 RE_{23}	—	September 12, 2006	Catalina	CSS	·	2.9 km	MPC · JPL
175481	2006 RK_{26}	—	September 14, 2006	Catalina	CSS	·	4.4 km	MPC · JPL
175482	2006 RT_{26}	—	September 14, 2006	Kitt Peak	Spacewatch	·	2.7 km	MPC · JPL
175483	2006 RU_{26}	—	September 14, 2006	Palomar	NEAT	·	4.6 km	MPC · JPL
175484	2006 RV_{30}	—	September 15, 2006	Socorro	LINEAR	EOS	4.5 km	MPC · JPL
175485	2006 RE_{31}	—	September 15, 2006	Socorro	LINEAR	·	3.3 km	MPC · JPL
175486	2006 RE_{35}	—	September 14, 2006	Palomar	NEAT	·	3.3 km	MPC · JPL
175487	2006 RW_{35}	—	September 14, 2006	Catalina	CSS	·	6.2 km	MPC · JPL
175488	2006 RG_{39}	—	September 14, 2006	Catalina	CSS	·	5.5 km	MPC · JPL
175489	2006 RF_{40}	—	September 12, 2006	Catalina	CSS	NYS	1.7 km	MPC · JPL
175490	2006 RL_{45}	—	September 14, 2006	Kitt Peak	Spacewatch	·	2.3 km	MPC · JPL
175491	2006 RQ_{46}	—	September 14, 2006	Kitt Peak	Spacewatch	MAS	920 m	MPC · JPL
175492	2006 RX_{47}	—	September 14, 2006	Palomar	NEAT	·	3.6 km	MPC · JPL
175493	2006 RD_{50}	—	September 14, 2006	Kitt Peak	Spacewatch	·	2.3 km	MPC · JPL
175494	2006 RA_{52}	—	September 14, 2006	Kitt Peak	Spacewatch	·	2.8 km	MPC · JPL
175495	2006 RC_{64}	—	September 12, 2006	Catalina	CSS	AGN	1.7 km	MPC · JPL
175496	2006 RE_{64}	—	September 12, 2006	Catalina	CSS	THM	3.6 km	MPC · JPL
175497	2006 RH_{64}	—	September 12, 2006	Catalina	CSS	KOR	2.1 km	MPC · JPL
175498	2006 RZ_{68}	—	September 15, 2006	Kitt Peak	Spacewatch	AGN	1.7 km	MPC · JPL
175499	2006 RJ_{78}	—	September 15, 2006	Kitt Peak	Spacewatch	·	1.8 km	MPC · JPL
175500	2006 RA_{81}	—	September 15, 2006	Kitt Peak	Spacewatch	·	1.8 km	MPC · JPL

== 175501–175600 ==
back to top

Designation			Discovery			Properties		Ref
Permanent	Provisional	Named after	Date	Site	Discoverer(s)	Category	Diam.	Ref
175501	2006 RF_{82}	—	September 15, 2006	Kitt Peak	Spacewatch	·	2.8 km	MPC · JPL
175502	2006 RU_{95}	—	September 15, 2006	Kitt Peak	Spacewatch	·	5.3 km	MPC · JPL
175503	2006 RU_{97}	—	September 15, 2006	Kitt Peak	Spacewatch	(11882)	2.3 km	MPC · JPL
175504	2006 RE_{101}	—	September 14, 2006	Palomar	NEAT	·	2.1 km	MPC · JPL
175505	2006 RQ_{104}	—	September 15, 2006	Apache Point	A. C. Becker	·	2.7 km	MPC · JPL
175506	2006 SO_{2}	—	September 16, 2006	Kitt Peak	Spacewatch	KOR	1.8 km	MPC · JPL
175507	2006 SO_{8}	—	September 16, 2006	Anderson Mesa	LONEOS	·	2.0 km	MPC · JPL
175508	2006 SO_{11}	—	September 16, 2006	Socorro	LINEAR	NYS	1.6 km	MPC · JPL
175509	2006 SK_{14}	—	September 17, 2006	Catalina	CSS	·	1.0 km	MPC · JPL
175510	2006 SX_{18}	—	September 17, 2006	Kitt Peak	Spacewatch	·	2.2 km	MPC · JPL
175511	2006 SP_{20}	—	September 16, 2006	Palomar	NEAT	·	3.8 km	MPC · JPL
175512	2006 SH_{23}	—	September 17, 2006	Anderson Mesa	LONEOS	EUN	2.2 km	MPC · JPL
175513	2006 SS_{26}	—	September 16, 2006	Anderson Mesa	LONEOS	PAD	3.7 km	MPC · JPL
175514	2006 SW_{35}	—	September 17, 2006	Anderson Mesa	LONEOS	WIT	1.8 km	MPC · JPL
175515	2006 SL_{39}	—	September 18, 2006	Catalina	CSS	·	4.1 km	MPC · JPL
175516	2006 SS_{41}	—	September 18, 2006	Anderson Mesa	LONEOS	·	1.8 km	MPC · JPL
175517	2006 SZ_{47}	—	September 19, 2006	Catalina	CSS	KOR	2.0 km	MPC · JPL
175518	2006 SY_{50}	—	September 17, 2006	Catalina	CSS	EMA	6.6 km	MPC · JPL
175519	2006 SR_{54}	—	September 18, 2006	Catalina	CSS	·	1.1 km	MPC · JPL
175520	2006 SZ_{57}	—	September 17, 2006	Anderson Mesa	LONEOS	TIR	5.6 km	MPC · JPL
175521	2006 SY_{60}	—	September 18, 2006	Catalina	CSS	·	2.8 km	MPC · JPL
175522	2006 SQ_{62}	—	September 18, 2006	Catalina	CSS	·	1.9 km	MPC · JPL
175523	2006 SE_{70}	—	September 19, 2006	Kitt Peak	Spacewatch	MAS	1.1 km	MPC · JPL
175524	2006 SM_{72}	—	September 19, 2006	Kitt Peak	Spacewatch	AGN	1.6 km	MPC · JPL
175525	2006 SP_{72}	—	September 19, 2006	Kitt Peak	Spacewatch	·	4.9 km	MPC · JPL
175526	2006 SG_{73}	—	September 19, 2006	Kitt Peak	Spacewatch	·	2.4 km	MPC · JPL
175527	2006 SN_{89}	—	September 18, 2006	Kitt Peak	Spacewatch	·	5.3 km	MPC · JPL
175528	2006 SQ_{90}	—	September 18, 2006	Kitt Peak	Spacewatch	KOR	1.6 km	MPC · JPL
175529	2006 ST_{116}	—	September 24, 2006	Kitt Peak	Spacewatch	·	3.5 km	MPC · JPL
175530	2006 SH_{120}	—	September 18, 2006	Catalina	CSS	·	6.4 km	MPC · JPL
175531	2006 SJ_{120}	—	September 18, 2006	Catalina	CSS	·	1.7 km	MPC · JPL
175532	2006 SK_{122}	—	September 19, 2006	Catalina	CSS	EUN	1.7 km	MPC · JPL
175533	2006 SE_{124}	—	September 19, 2006	Catalina	CSS	·	2.9 km	MPC · JPL
175534	2006 SR_{126}	—	September 21, 2006	Anderson Mesa	LONEOS	·	4.3 km	MPC · JPL
175535	2006 SR_{142}	—	September 19, 2006	Catalina	CSS	MAS	840 m	MPC · JPL
175536	2006 ST_{167}	—	September 25, 2006	Kitt Peak	Spacewatch	·	2.7 km	MPC · JPL
175537	2006 SZ_{173}	—	September 25, 2006	Mount Lemmon	Mount Lemmon Survey	(12739)	2.3 km	MPC · JPL
175538	2006 SO_{193}	—	September 26, 2006	Catalina	CSS	PAD	5.1 km	MPC · JPL
175539	2006 SY_{201}	—	September 24, 2006	Kitt Peak	Spacewatch	HOF	3.5 km	MPC · JPL
175540	2006 SU_{202}	—	September 25, 2006	Anderson Mesa	LONEOS	·	1.7 km	MPC · JPL
175541	2006 SP_{212}	—	September 26, 2006	Kitt Peak	Spacewatch	·	2.8 km	MPC · JPL
175542	2006 SO_{218}	—	September 29, 2006	RAS	Lowe, A.	EOS	2.8 km	MPC · JPL
175543	2006 ST_{218}	—	September 29, 2006	Kitami	K. Endate	·	1.5 km	MPC · JPL
175544	2006 SS_{243}	—	September 26, 2006	Kitt Peak	Spacewatch	PAD	3.1 km	MPC · JPL
175545	2006 ST_{253}	—	September 26, 2006	Mount Lemmon	Mount Lemmon Survey	·	1.3 km	MPC · JPL
175546	2006 SQ_{271}	—	September 27, 2006	Mount Lemmon	Mount Lemmon Survey	·	6.3 km	MPC · JPL
175547	2006 SS_{280}	—	September 29, 2006	Anderson Mesa	LONEOS	·	3.6 km	MPC · JPL
175548 Sūdžius	2006 SG_{285}	Sūdžius	September 27, 2006	Molėtai	K. Černis, Zdanavicius, J.	·	2.3 km	MPC · JPL
175549	2006 SO_{290}	—	September 25, 2006	Kitt Peak	Spacewatch	·	2.6 km	MPC · JPL
175550	2006 SW_{300}	—	September 26, 2006	Catalina	CSS	·	2.6 km	MPC · JPL
175551	2006 SW_{303}	—	September 27, 2006	Mount Lemmon	Mount Lemmon Survey	·	2.1 km	MPC · JPL
175552	2006 SO_{323}	—	September 27, 2006	Kitt Peak	Spacewatch	·	3.1 km	MPC · JPL
175553	2006 SB_{325}	—	September 27, 2006	Kitt Peak	Spacewatch	·	5.9 km	MPC · JPL
175554	2006 SA_{329}	—	September 27, 2006	Kitt Peak	Spacewatch	·	1.5 km	MPC · JPL
175555	2006 SZ_{331}	—	September 28, 2006	Mount Lemmon	Mount Lemmon Survey	EOS	2.6 km	MPC · JPL
175556	2006 SO_{352}	—	September 30, 2006	Catalina	CSS	EOS	3.4 km	MPC · JPL
175557	2006 SH_{353}	—	September 30, 2006	Catalina	CSS	·	3.7 km	MPC · JPL
175558	2006 SN_{353}	—	September 30, 2006	Catalina	CSS	·	2.9 km	MPC · JPL
175559	2006 SX_{356}	—	September 30, 2006	Catalina	CSS	EOS	2.9 km	MPC · JPL
175560	2006 SZ_{359}	—	September 30, 2006	Catalina	CSS	·	2.3 km	MPC · JPL
175561	2006 SX_{366}	—	September 19, 2006	Catalina	CSS	BRA	2.5 km	MPC · JPL
175562 Ajsingh	2006 SF_{382}	Ajsingh	September 28, 2006	Apache Point	A. C. Becker	·	3.3 km	MPC · JPL
175563 Amyrose	2006 SR_{389}	Amyrose	September 30, 2006	Apache Point	A. C. Becker	·	2.5 km	MPC · JPL
175564	2006 SK_{393}	—	September 28, 2006	Catalina	CSS	·	4.7 km	MPC · JPL
175565	2006 TV	—	October 2, 2006	Catalina	CSS	·	6.1 km	MPC · JPL
175566 Papplaci	2006 TM_{7}	Papplaci	October 1, 2006	Piszkéstető	K. Sárneczky, B. Csák	·	3.0 km	MPC · JPL
175567 Csadaimre	2006 TM_{10}	Csadaimre	October 14, 2006	Piszkéstető	K. Sárneczky, Kuli, Z.	·	1.1 km	MPC · JPL
175568	2006 TT_{17}	—	October 11, 2006	Kitt Peak	Spacewatch	KOR	1.9 km	MPC · JPL
175569	2006 TL_{19}	—	October 11, 2006	Kitt Peak	Spacewatch	·	3.1 km	MPC · JPL
175570	2006 TO_{19}	—	October 11, 2006	Kitt Peak	Spacewatch	KOR	1.9 km	MPC · JPL
175571	2006 TQ_{25}	—	October 12, 2006	Kitt Peak	Spacewatch	·	4.6 km	MPC · JPL
175572	2006 TB_{42}	—	October 12, 2006	Kitt Peak	Spacewatch	·	3.8 km	MPC · JPL
175573	2006 TK_{50}	—	October 12, 2006	Palomar	NEAT	·	4.0 km	MPC · JPL
175574	2006 TV_{54}	—	October 12, 2006	Palomar	NEAT	·	6.5 km	MPC · JPL
175575	2006 TW_{61}	—	October 9, 2006	Palomar	NEAT	·	3.0 km	MPC · JPL
175576	2006 TJ_{62}	—	October 9, 2006	Palomar	NEAT	EOS	2.8 km	MPC · JPL
175577	2006 TK_{75}	—	October 11, 2006	Palomar	NEAT	·	3.6 km	MPC · JPL
175578	2006 TU_{76}	—	October 11, 2006	Palomar	NEAT	EOS	3.5 km	MPC · JPL
175579	2006 TQ_{84}	—	October 13, 2006	Kitt Peak	Spacewatch	·	2.4 km	MPC · JPL
175580	2006 TN_{90}	—	October 13, 2006	Kitt Peak	Spacewatch	·	3.5 km	MPC · JPL
175581	2006 TR_{93}	—	October 15, 2006	Kitt Peak	Spacewatch	·	2.4 km	MPC · JPL
175582	2006 TK_{94}	—	October 15, 2006	Catalina	CSS	(2076)	1.2 km	MPC · JPL
175583 Pingtung	2006 TV_{94}	Pingtung	October 15, 2006	Lulin Observatory	Lin, C.-S., Q. Ye	(43176)	4.7 km	MPC · JPL
175584	2006 TP_{99}	—	October 15, 2006	Kitt Peak	Spacewatch	·	2.1 km	MPC · JPL
175585	2006 TW_{100}	—	October 15, 2006	Kitt Peak	Spacewatch	·	3.9 km	MPC · JPL
175586 Tsou	2006 TU_{106}	Tsou	October 15, 2006	Lulin Observatory	Q. Ye, Lin, C.-S.	·	4.2 km	MPC · JPL
175587	2006 TB_{109}	—	October 2, 2006	Mount Lemmon	Mount Lemmon Survey	·	1.9 km	MPC · JPL
175588 Kathrynsmith	2006 TK_{117}	Kathrynsmith	October 3, 2006	Apache Point	A. C. Becker	·	3.0 km	MPC · JPL
175589	2006 UD	—	October 16, 2006	Catalina	CSS	·	2.6 km	MPC · JPL
175590	2006 UE_{5}	—	October 16, 2006	Kitt Peak	Spacewatch	·	1.3 km	MPC · JPL
175591	2006 UU_{23}	—	October 16, 2006	Kitt Peak	Spacewatch	·	2.4 km	MPC · JPL
175592	2006 UH_{30}	—	October 16, 2006	Kitt Peak	Spacewatch	KOR	1.6 km	MPC · JPL
175593	2006 UM_{36}	—	October 16, 2006	Kitt Peak	Spacewatch	·	1.9 km	MPC · JPL
175594	2006 UZ_{36}	—	October 16, 2006	Catalina	CSS	·	2.5 km	MPC · JPL
175595	2006 UY_{44}	—	October 16, 2006	Kitt Peak	Spacewatch	·	1.8 km	MPC · JPL
175596	2006 UM_{56}	—	October 18, 2006	Kitt Peak	Spacewatch	·	2.5 km	MPC · JPL
175597	2006 UF_{81}	—	October 17, 2006	Mount Lemmon	Mount Lemmon Survey	·	3.8 km	MPC · JPL
175598	2006 UP_{86}	—	October 17, 2006	Mount Lemmon	Mount Lemmon Survey	KOR	1.9 km	MPC · JPL
175599	2006 UT_{106}	—	October 18, 2006	Kitt Peak	Spacewatch	·	5.2 km	MPC · JPL
175600	2006 UW_{176}	—	October 16, 2006	Catalina	CSS	·	2.7 km	MPC · JPL

== 175601–175700 ==
back to top

Designation			Discovery			Properties		Ref
Permanent	Provisional	Named after	Date	Site	Discoverer(s)	Category	Diam.	Ref
175601	2006 UV_{182}	—	October 16, 2006	Catalina	CSS	·	3.3 km	MPC · JPL
175602	2006 UR_{187}	—	October 19, 2006	Catalina	CSS	·	3.4 km	MPC · JPL
175603	2006 UN_{191}	—	October 19, 2006	Catalina	CSS	EOS ·	5.4 km	MPC · JPL
175604	2006 UL_{228}	—	October 20, 2006	Palomar	NEAT	·	4.0 km	MPC · JPL
175605	2006 UH_{230}	—	October 21, 2006	Catalina	CSS	KOR	2.1 km	MPC · JPL
175606	2006 UJ_{230}	—	October 21, 2006	Catalina	CSS	·	1.6 km	MPC · JPL
175607	2006 UD_{275}	—	October 28, 2006	Kitt Peak	Spacewatch	·	1.7 km	MPC · JPL
175608	2006 VB_{4}	—	November 9, 2006	Kitt Peak	Spacewatch	KOR	2.0 km	MPC · JPL
175609	2006 VM_{11}	—	November 11, 2006	Mount Lemmon	Mount Lemmon Survey	THM	3.2 km	MPC · JPL
175610	2006 VT_{19}	—	November 9, 2006	Kitt Peak	Spacewatch	·	3.7 km	MPC · JPL
175611	2006 VF_{31}	—	November 10, 2006	Kitt Peak	Spacewatch	·	4.3 km	MPC · JPL
175612	2006 VY_{82}	—	November 13, 2006	Kitt Peak	Spacewatch	KOR	2.2 km	MPC · JPL
175613 Shikoku-karst	2006 VB_{95}	Shikoku-karst	November 12, 2006	Kuma Kogen	Fujita, Y.	·	3.7 km	MPC · JPL
175614	2006 VC_{144}	—	November 15, 2006	Catalina	CSS	EOS	2.9 km	MPC · JPL
175615	2006 VN_{154}	—	November 8, 2006	Palomar	NEAT	(5)	3.3 km	MPC · JPL
175616	2006 WV_{33}	—	November 16, 2006	Kitt Peak	Spacewatch	·	3.2 km	MPC · JPL
175617	2006 WA_{36}	—	November 16, 2006	Kitt Peak	Spacewatch	·	3.5 km	MPC · JPL
175618	2006 WQ_{47}	—	November 16, 2006	Kitt Peak	Spacewatch	·	3.4 km	MPC · JPL
175619	2006 WO_{53}	—	November 16, 2006	Catalina	CSS	·	2.1 km	MPC · JPL
175620	2006 WE_{99}	—	November 19, 2006	Kitt Peak	Spacewatch	3:2	8.0 km	MPC · JPL
175621	2006 WX_{125}	—	November 22, 2006	Mount Lemmon	Mount Lemmon Survey	·	6.2 km	MPC · JPL
175622	2006 XX_{4}	—	December 15, 2006	Siding Spring	SSS	·	2.3 km	MPC · JPL
175623	2006 YR_{14}	—	December 22, 2006	Črni Vrh	Mikuž, H.	BRA	2.6 km	MPC · JPL
175624	2006 YM_{47}	—	December 23, 2006	Mount Lemmon	Mount Lemmon Survey	·	2.6 km	MPC · JPL
175625 Canaryastroinst	2007 OK_{7}	Canaryastroinst	July 23, 2007	OAM	OAM	·	6.2 km	MPC · JPL
175626	2007 PK_{25}	—	August 11, 2007	Socorro	LINEAR	·	4.9 km	MPC · JPL
175627	2007 RE_{81}	—	September 10, 2007	Catalina	CSS	MAR	1.6 km	MPC · JPL
175628	2007 RW_{275}	—	September 10, 2007	Catalina	CSS	·	3.1 km	MPC · JPL
175629 Lambertini	2007 SX_{1}	Lambertini	September 19, 2007	Skylive Obs.	Tozzi, F., Graziani, M.	·	2.8 km	MPC · JPL
175630	2007 TQ_{41}	—	October 6, 2007	Kitt Peak	Spacewatch	·	3.4 km	MPC · JPL
175631	2007 TD_{47}	—	October 4, 2007	Kitt Peak	Spacewatch	·	3.8 km	MPC · JPL
175632	2007 TG_{85}	—	October 8, 2007	Mount Lemmon	Mount Lemmon Survey	·	2.2 km	MPC · JPL
175633 Yaoan	2007 TF_{184}	Yaoan	October 9, 2007	Purple Mountain	PMO NEO Survey Program	·	4.9 km	MPC · JPL
175634	2007 TV_{216}	—	October 7, 2007	Kitt Peak	Spacewatch	·	4.0 km	MPC · JPL
175635	2007 TO_{279}	—	October 12, 2007	Anderson Mesa	LONEOS	·	4.0 km	MPC · JPL
175636 Zvyagel	2007 UP_{4}	Zvyagel	October 17, 2007	Andrushivka	Andrushivka	·	5.9 km	MPC · JPL
175637	2007 US_{25}	—	October 16, 2007	Kitt Peak	Spacewatch	·	1.1 km	MPC · JPL
175638	2007 UF_{47}	—	October 21, 2007	Kitt Peak	Spacewatch	·	3.5 km	MPC · JPL
175639	2007 UC_{51}	—	October 24, 2007	Mount Lemmon	Mount Lemmon Survey	·	1.4 km	MPC · JPL
175640	2007 UZ_{104}	—	October 30, 2007	Kitt Peak	Spacewatch	NYS	2.3 km	MPC · JPL
175641	2007 VD_{32}	—	November 2, 2007	Kitt Peak	Spacewatch	·	2.9 km	MPC · JPL
175642	2007 VB_{76}	—	November 3, 2007	Kitt Peak	Spacewatch	·	1.3 km	MPC · JPL
175643	2007 VF_{165}	—	November 5, 2007	Kitt Peak	Spacewatch	NYS	1.1 km	MPC · JPL
175644	2007 VK_{166}	—	November 5, 2007	Kitt Peak	Spacewatch	·	2.1 km	MPC · JPL
175645	2007 VG_{263}	—	November 13, 2007	Kitt Peak	Spacewatch	·	1.9 km	MPC · JPL
175646	2007 VQ_{290}	—	November 14, 2007	Kitt Peak	Spacewatch	·	2.6 km	MPC · JPL
175647	4091 P-L	—	September 24, 1960	Palomar	C. J. van Houten, I. van Houten-Groeneveld, T. Gehrels	·	1.8 km	MPC · JPL
175648	4326 P-L	—	September 24, 1960	Palomar	C. J. van Houten, I. van Houten-Groeneveld, T. Gehrels	·	1.4 km	MPC · JPL
175649	6233 P-L	—	September 24, 1960	Palomar	C. J. van Houten, I. van Houten-Groeneveld, T. Gehrels	·	1.3 km	MPC · JPL
175650	1408 T-2	—	September 29, 1973	Palomar	C. J. van Houten, I. van Houten-Groeneveld, T. Gehrels	·	1.6 km	MPC · JPL
175651	3094 T-2	—	September 30, 1973	Palomar	C. J. van Houten, I. van Houten-Groeneveld, T. Gehrels	·	2.4 km	MPC · JPL
175652	3257 T-2	—	September 30, 1973	Palomar	C. J. van Houten, I. van Houten-Groeneveld, T. Gehrels	NYS	1.4 km	MPC · JPL
175653	1014 T-3	—	October 17, 1977	Palomar	C. J. van Houten, I. van Houten-Groeneveld, T. Gehrels	·	3.6 km	MPC · JPL
175654	2130 T-3	—	October 16, 1977	Palomar	C. J. van Houten, I. van Houten-Groeneveld, T. Gehrels	·	1.3 km	MPC · JPL
175655	3306 T-3	—	October 16, 1977	Palomar	C. J. van Houten, I. van Houten-Groeneveld, T. Gehrels	·	740 m	MPC · JPL
175656	3397 T-3	—	October 16, 1977	Palomar	C. J. van Houten, I. van Houten-Groeneveld, T. Gehrels	·	2.0 km	MPC · JPL
175657	3426 T-3	—	October 16, 1977	Palomar	C. J. van Houten, I. van Houten-Groeneveld, T. Gehrels	NYS	1.2 km	MPC · JPL
175658	3578 T-3	—	October 11, 1977	Palomar	C. J. van Houten, I. van Houten-Groeneveld, T. Gehrels	·	1.9 km	MPC · JPL
175659	1981 EP_{23}	—	March 3, 1981	Siding Spring	S. J. Bus	·	4.9 km	MPC · JPL
175660	1981 QC_{3}	—	August 24, 1981	La Silla	H. Debehogne	·	3.0 km	MPC · JPL
175661	1989 SC_{14}	—	September 26, 1989	Calar Alto	J. M. Baur, K. Birkle	ADE	2.8 km	MPC · JPL
175662	1993 BB_{10}	—	January 22, 1993	Kitt Peak	Spacewatch	MAS	1 km	MPC · JPL
175663	1993 FD_{48}	—	March 19, 1993	La Silla	UESAC	·	1.9 km	MPC · JPL
175664	1993 KK_{1}	—	May 24, 1993	Kitt Peak	Spacewatch	·	5.0 km	MPC · JPL
175665	1993 MJ	—	June 16, 1993	Kitt Peak	Spacewatch	·	880 m	MPC · JPL
175666	1993 TS_{9}	—	October 12, 1993	Kitt Peak	Spacewatch	·	2.0 km	MPC · JPL
175667	1993 TX_{24}	—	October 9, 1993	La Silla	E. W. Elst	·	3.4 km	MPC · JPL
175668	1994 AZ_{9}	—	January 8, 1994	Kitt Peak	Spacewatch	KOR	2.1 km	MPC · JPL
175669	1994 LT_{3}	—	June 3, 1994	La Silla	H. Debehogne	·	1.8 km	MPC · JPL
175670	1994 PN_{32}	—	August 12, 1994	La Silla	E. W. Elst	·	5.2 km	MPC · JPL
175671	1994 SV_{6}	—	September 28, 1994	Kitt Peak	Spacewatch	·	3.0 km	MPC · JPL
175672	1994 UN_{7}	—	October 28, 1994	Kitt Peak	Spacewatch	·	3.5 km	MPC · JPL
175673	1994 UY_{10}	—	October 29, 1994	Kitt Peak	Spacewatch	·	4.5 km	MPC · JPL
175674	1994 WP_{6}	—	November 28, 1994	Kitt Peak	Spacewatch	·	1.8 km	MPC · JPL
175675	1995 CJ_{4}	—	February 1, 1995	Kitt Peak	Spacewatch	·	2.4 km	MPC · JPL
175676	1995 DK_{8}	—	February 24, 1995	Kitt Peak	Spacewatch	NEM	2.6 km	MPC · JPL
175677	1995 EV_{4}	—	March 2, 1995	Kitt Peak	Spacewatch	·	2.8 km	MPC · JPL
175678	1995 FA_{4}	—	March 23, 1995	Kitt Peak	Spacewatch	·	3.1 km	MPC · JPL
175679	1995 GE_{1}	—	April 1, 1995	Kitt Peak	Spacewatch	·	2.6 km	MPC · JPL
175680	1995 GU_{1}	—	April 1, 1995	Kitt Peak	Spacewatch	·	3.9 km	MPC · JPL
175681	1995 GU_{2}	—	April 2, 1995	Kitt Peak	Spacewatch	·	2.5 km	MPC · JPL
175682	1995 MC_{5}	—	June 22, 1995	Kitt Peak	Spacewatch	·	1.0 km	MPC · JPL
175683	1995 OK_{13}	—	July 22, 1995	Kitt Peak	Spacewatch	MAS	980 m	MPC · JPL
175684	1995 QC_{16}	—	August 27, 1995	Kitt Peak	Spacewatch	·	1.8 km	MPC · JPL
175685	1995 SB_{6}	—	September 17, 1995	Kitt Peak	Spacewatch	·	1.7 km	MPC · JPL
175686	1995 SE_{11}	—	September 17, 1995	Kitt Peak	Spacewatch	V	780 m	MPC · JPL
175687	1995 SV_{12}	—	September 18, 1995	Kitt Peak	Spacewatch	·	2.5 km	MPC · JPL
175688	1995 SF_{13}	—	September 18, 1995	Kitt Peak	Spacewatch	·	2.2 km	MPC · JPL
175689	1995 SX_{17}	—	September 18, 1995	Kitt Peak	Spacewatch	TIR	3.1 km	MPC · JPL
175690	1995 SX_{34}	—	September 22, 1995	Kitt Peak	Spacewatch	KOR	2.1 km	MPC · JPL
175691	1995 SM_{38}	—	September 24, 1995	Kitt Peak	Spacewatch	V	890 m	MPC · JPL
175692	1995 SH_{40}	—	September 25, 1995	Kitt Peak	Spacewatch	MAS	900 m	MPC · JPL
175693	1995 SZ_{41}	—	September 25, 1995	Kitt Peak	Spacewatch	·	2.7 km	MPC · JPL
175694	1995 ST_{51}	—	September 26, 1995	Kitt Peak	Spacewatch	·	2.8 km	MPC · JPL
175695	1995 TU_{7}	—	October 15, 1995	Kitt Peak	Spacewatch	NYS	1.8 km	MPC · JPL
175696	1995 TS_{8}	—	October 1, 1995	Kitt Peak	Spacewatch	NYS	1.3 km	MPC · JPL
175697	1995 UG_{2}	—	October 23, 1995	Kleť	Kleť	·	1.8 km	MPC · JPL
175698	1995 UQ_{8}	—	October 20, 1995	Haleakala	AMOS	·	4.6 km	MPC · JPL
175699	1995 UK_{12}	—	October 17, 1995	Kitt Peak	Spacewatch	MAS	1.1 km	MPC · JPL
175700	1995 UM_{18}	—	October 18, 1995	Kitt Peak	Spacewatch	EOS	2.9 km	MPC · JPL

== 175701–175800 ==
back to top

Designation			Discovery			Properties		Ref
Permanent	Provisional	Named after	Date	Site	Discoverer(s)	Category	Diam.	Ref
175701	1995 UO_{40}	—	October 23, 1995	Kitt Peak	Spacewatch	·	4.8 km	MPC · JPL
175702	1995 UB_{58}	—	October 17, 1995	Kitt Peak	Spacewatch	MAS	960 m	MPC · JPL
175703	1995 UC_{69}	—	October 19, 1995	Kitt Peak	Spacewatch	·	1.6 km	MPC · JPL
175704	1995 VS_{6}	—	November 14, 1995	Kitt Peak	Spacewatch	MAS	1.2 km	MPC · JPL
175705	1995 WW_{40}	—	November 24, 1995	Kitt Peak	Spacewatch	·	3.2 km	MPC · JPL
175706	1996 FG_{3}	—	March 24, 1996	Siding Spring	R. H. McNaught	APO +1km · PHA · moon	1.2 km	MPC · JPL
175707	1996 QA_{1}	—	August 20, 1996	Kleť	Kleť	DOR	3.9 km	MPC · JPL
175708	1996 RF_{1}	—	September 9, 1996	Prescott	P. G. Comba	·	930 m	MPC · JPL
175709	1996 RQ_{6}	—	September 5, 1996	Kitt Peak	Spacewatch	·	1.7 km	MPC · JPL
175710	1996 SK_{7}	—	September 23, 1996	Nanyo	T. Okuni	·	7.6 km	MPC · JPL
175711	1996 TW_{42}	—	October 4, 1996	Kitt Peak	Spacewatch	·	3.6 km	MPC · JPL
175712	1996 TP_{54}	—	October 5, 1996	Xinglong	SCAP	·	870 m	MPC · JPL
175713	1996 VX_{11}	—	November 4, 1996	Kitt Peak	Spacewatch	·	2.9 km	MPC · JPL
175714	1996 VJ_{35}	—	November 9, 1996	Kitt Peak	Spacewatch	·	1.3 km	MPC · JPL
175715	1996 XR_{3}	—	December 1, 1996	Kitt Peak	Spacewatch	(2076)	1.1 km	MPC · JPL
175716	1996 XW_{24}	—	December 9, 1996	Kitt Peak	Spacewatch	·	2.9 km	MPC · JPL
175717	1997 CX_{5}	—	February 6, 1997	Kitt Peak	Spacewatch	·	650 m	MPC · JPL
175718 Wuzhengyi	1997 CG_{19}	Wuzhengyi	February 2, 1997	Xinglong	SCAP	NYS	1.6 km	MPC · JPL
175719	1997 ED_{4}	—	March 2, 1997	Kitt Peak	Spacewatch	·	4.5 km	MPC · JPL
175720	1997 EB_{12}	—	March 2, 1997	Kitt Peak	Spacewatch	·	3.3 km	MPC · JPL
175721	1997 GU	—	April 6, 1997	Haleakala	NEAT	·	1.7 km	MPC · JPL
175722	1997 GP_{1}	—	April 5, 1997	Mauna Kea	Veillet, C.	·	5.6 km	MPC · JPL
175723	1997 GC_{10}	—	April 3, 1997	Socorro	LINEAR	·	1.5 km	MPC · JPL
175724	1997 GN_{25}	—	April 8, 1997	Kitt Peak	Spacewatch	·	1.7 km	MPC · JPL
175725	1997 NZ_{5}	—	July 7, 1997	Kitt Peak	Spacewatch	·	2.2 km	MPC · JPL
175726 Borda	1997 QJ_{1}	Borda	August 29, 1997	Dax	P. Dupouy, Marechal, F.	(5)	2.2 km	MPC · JPL
175727	1997 SA_{13}	—	September 28, 1997	Kitt Peak	Spacewatch	EUN	1.5 km	MPC · JPL
175728	1998 BT_{5}	—	January 22, 1998	Kitt Peak	Spacewatch	·	890 m	MPC · JPL
175729	1998 BB_{10}	—	January 25, 1998	Haleakala	NEAT	APO · PHA	290 m	MPC · JPL
175730 Gramastetten	1998 DM_{1}	Gramastetten	February 18, 1998	Linz	Linz	·	1.0 km	MPC · JPL
175731	1998 DW_{36}	—	February 28, 1998	La Silla	C.-I. Lagerkvist	·	1.4 km	MPC · JPL
175732	1998 EW_{8}	—	March 6, 1998	Teide	Teide	·	1.1 km	MPC · JPL
175733	1998 FD_{88}	—	March 24, 1998	Socorro	LINEAR	·	1.5 km	MPC · JPL
175734	1998 FA_{122}	—	March 20, 1998	Socorro	LINEAR	·	2.3 km	MPC · JPL
175735	1998 HA_{1}	—	April 17, 1998	Kitt Peak	Spacewatch	·	1.6 km	MPC · JPL
175736 Pierreléna	1998 HJ_{6}	Pierreléna	April 21, 1998	Caussols	ODAS	·	1.1 km	MPC · JPL
175737	1998 HO_{15}	—	April 20, 1998	Kitt Peak	Spacewatch	URS	5.9 km	MPC · JPL
175738	1998 HR_{66}	—	April 21, 1998	Socorro	LINEAR	·	3.0 km	MPC · JPL
175739	1998 JL_{4}	—	May 5, 1998	Woomera	F. B. Zoltowski	·	1.2 km	MPC · JPL
175740	1998 KR_{10}	—	May 22, 1998	Kitt Peak	Spacewatch	EOS	2.6 km	MPC · JPL
175741	1998 MQ_{24}	—	June 26, 1998	Woomera	F. B. Zoltowski	V	1.2 km	MPC · JPL
175742	1998 MF_{47}	—	June 28, 1998	La Silla	E. W. Elst	·	1.7 km	MPC · JPL
175743	1998 OS_{1}	—	July 24, 1998	Prescott	P. G. Comba	·	1.9 km	MPC · JPL
175744	1998 QK_{47}	—	August 17, 1998	Socorro	LINEAR	·	1.7 km	MPC · JPL
175745	1998 QM_{49}	—	August 17, 1998	Socorro	LINEAR	V	1.6 km	MPC · JPL
175746	1998 QJ_{61}	—	August 23, 1998	Anderson Mesa	LONEOS	·	1.5 km	MPC · JPL
175747	1998 QK_{78}	—	August 24, 1998	Socorro	LINEAR	·	4.1 km	MPC · JPL
175748	1998 QO_{88}	—	August 24, 1998	Socorro	LINEAR	·	2.1 km	MPC · JPL
175749	1998 QN_{90}	—	August 24, 1998	Socorro	LINEAR	JUN	1.8 km	MPC · JPL
175750	1998 RY_{21}	—	September 15, 1998	Kitt Peak	Spacewatch	MAS	1.1 km	MPC · JPL
175751	1998 RN_{26}	—	September 14, 1998	Socorro	LINEAR	·	3.4 km	MPC · JPL
175752	1998 RL_{47}	—	September 14, 1998	Socorro	LINEAR	·	2.4 km	MPC · JPL
175753	1998 RT_{47}	—	September 14, 1998	Socorro	LINEAR	·	3.0 km	MPC · JPL
175754	1998 RH_{48}	—	September 14, 1998	Socorro	LINEAR	·	1.2 km	MPC · JPL
175755	1998 RX_{56}	—	September 14, 1998	Socorro	LINEAR	·	2.0 km	MPC · JPL
175756	1998 RR_{58}	—	September 14, 1998	Socorro	LINEAR	·	1.6 km	MPC · JPL
175757	1998 SX_{10}	—	September 16, 1998	Caussols	ODAS	·	2.7 km	MPC · JPL
175758	1998 SH_{21}	—	September 21, 1998	Kitt Peak	Spacewatch	NYS	1.8 km	MPC · JPL
175759	1998 SL_{32}	—	September 23, 1998	Kitt Peak	Spacewatch	NYS	1.5 km	MPC · JPL
175760	1998 SG_{39}	—	September 23, 1998	Kitt Peak	Spacewatch	·	1.7 km	MPC · JPL
175761	1998 SH_{48}	—	September 27, 1998	Kitt Peak	Spacewatch	(5)	1.2 km	MPC · JPL
175762	1998 SS_{101}	—	September 26, 1998	Socorro	LINEAR	·	2.0 km	MPC · JPL
175763	1998 TQ_{36}	—	October 12, 1998	Kitt Peak	Spacewatch	·	1.3 km	MPC · JPL
175764	1998 US_{3}	—	October 20, 1998	Caussols	ODAS	·	1.5 km	MPC · JPL
175765	1998 UR_{40}	—	October 28, 1998	Socorro	LINEAR	(5)	1.9 km	MPC · JPL
175766	1998 VW_{18}	—	November 10, 1998	Socorro	LINEAR	·	2.1 km	MPC · JPL
175767	1998 VO_{28}	—	November 10, 1998	Socorro	LINEAR	·	2.4 km	MPC · JPL
175768	1998 VB_{33}	—	November 11, 1998	Chichibu	N. Satō	·	2.2 km	MPC · JPL
175769	1998 VF_{55}	—	November 15, 1998	Višnjan Observatory	Višnjan	·	2.5 km	MPC · JPL
175770	1998 WG_{38}	—	November 21, 1998	Kitt Peak	Spacewatch	·	1.9 km	MPC · JPL
175771	1998 XO_{2}	—	December 7, 1998	San Marcello	L. Tesi, A. Boattini	(5)	2.1 km	MPC · JPL
175772	1998 XU_{8}	—	December 13, 1998	Prescott	P. G. Comba	·	2.4 km	MPC · JPL
175773	1998 XY_{17}	—	December 8, 1998	Kitt Peak	Spacewatch	·	2.5 km	MPC · JPL
175774	1999 AQ_{22}	—	January 14, 1999	Xinglong	SCAP	·	3.7 km	MPC · JPL
175775	1999 BW_{10}	—	January 19, 1999	Caussols	ODAS	·	2.8 km	MPC · JPL
175776	1999 CY_{92}	—	February 10, 1999	Socorro	LINEAR	EUN	1.9 km	MPC · JPL
175777	1999 CH_{93}	—	February 10, 1999	Socorro	LINEAR	·	2.7 km	MPC · JPL
175778	1999 CF_{101}	—	February 10, 1999	Socorro	LINEAR	·	3.9 km	MPC · JPL
175779	1999 CU_{140}	—	February 9, 1999	Kitt Peak	Spacewatch	·	2.0 km	MPC · JPL
175780	1999 CV_{151}	—	February 10, 1999	Kitt Peak	Spacewatch	·	1.9 km	MPC · JPL
175781	1999 FT_{1}	—	March 16, 1999	Kitt Peak	Spacewatch	MRX	1.4 km	MPC · JPL
175782	1999 FJ_{62}	—	March 22, 1999	Anderson Mesa	LONEOS	·	3.3 km	MPC · JPL
175783	1999 HD_{7}	—	April 19, 1999	Kitt Peak	Spacewatch	·	840 m	MPC · JPL
175784	1999 JX_{66}	—	May 12, 1999	Socorro	LINEAR	·	3.5 km	MPC · JPL
175785	1999 NR_{31}	—	July 14, 1999	Socorro	LINEAR	·	1.2 km	MPC · JPL
175786	1999 PT_{3}	—	August 12, 1999	Socorro	LINEAR	·	1.5 km	MPC · JPL
175787	1999 QL	—	August 17, 1999	Bergisch Gladbach	W. Bickel	V	920 m	MPC · JPL
175788	1999 RJ_{41}	—	September 13, 1999	Socorro	LINEAR	H	820 m	MPC · JPL
175789	1999 RG_{58}	—	September 7, 1999	Socorro	LINEAR	NYS	1.6 km	MPC · JPL
175790	1999 RV_{58}	—	September 7, 1999	Socorro	LINEAR	·	1.5 km	MPC · JPL
175791	1999 RM_{68}	—	September 7, 1999	Socorro	LINEAR	·	2.1 km	MPC · JPL
175792	1999 RV_{79}	—	September 7, 1999	Socorro	LINEAR	·	1.3 km	MPC · JPL
175793	1999 RY_{80}	—	September 7, 1999	Socorro	LINEAR	·	1.4 km	MPC · JPL
175794	1999 RU_{104}	—	September 8, 1999	Socorro	LINEAR	·	7.4 km	MPC · JPL
175795	1999 RO_{123}	—	September 9, 1999	Socorro	LINEAR	·	1.6 km	MPC · JPL
175796	1999 RO_{131}	—	September 9, 1999	Socorro	LINEAR	·	1.5 km	MPC · JPL
175797	1999 RO_{132}	—	September 9, 1999	Socorro	LINEAR	·	2.1 km	MPC · JPL
175798	1999 RK_{137}	—	September 9, 1999	Socorro	LINEAR	·	1.7 km	MPC · JPL
175799	1999 RT_{147}	—	September 9, 1999	Socorro	LINEAR	ERI	3.0 km	MPC · JPL
175800	1999 RE_{148}	—	September 9, 1999	Socorro	LINEAR	·	1.7 km	MPC · JPL

== 175801–175900 ==
back to top

Designation			Discovery			Properties		Ref
Permanent	Provisional	Named after	Date	Site	Discoverer(s)	Category	Diam.	Ref
175801	1999 RR_{148}	—	September 9, 1999	Socorro	LINEAR	·	1.2 km	MPC · JPL
175802	1999 RT_{149}	—	September 9, 1999	Socorro	LINEAR	AEG	5.8 km	MPC · JPL
175803	1999 RB_{155}	—	September 9, 1999	Socorro	LINEAR	·	5.5 km	MPC · JPL
175804	1999 RG_{155}	—	September 9, 1999	Socorro	LINEAR	·	1.4 km	MPC · JPL
175805	1999 RQ_{155}	—	September 9, 1999	Socorro	LINEAR	·	1.4 km	MPC · JPL
175806	1999 RE_{165}	—	September 9, 1999	Socorro	LINEAR	·	6.8 km	MPC · JPL
175807	1999 RP_{165}	—	September 9, 1999	Socorro	LINEAR	·	4.8 km	MPC · JPL
175808	1999 RT_{175}	—	September 9, 1999	Socorro	LINEAR	·	1.5 km	MPC · JPL
175809	1999 RU_{182}	—	September 9, 1999	Socorro	LINEAR	slow	1.2 km	MPC · JPL
175810	1999 RA_{187}	—	September 9, 1999	Socorro	LINEAR	·	1.1 km	MPC · JPL
175811	1999 RS_{193}	—	September 7, 1999	Socorro	LINEAR	·	4.2 km	MPC · JPL
175812	1999 RG_{201}	—	September 8, 1999	Socorro	LINEAR	·	3.2 km	MPC · JPL
175813	1999 RU_{207}	—	September 8, 1999	Socorro	LINEAR	(2076)	1.4 km	MPC · JPL
175814	1999 RC_{210}	—	September 8, 1999	Socorro	LINEAR	PHO	2.7 km	MPC · JPL
175815	1999 RC_{214}	—	September 13, 1999	Kitt Peak	Spacewatch	·	1.0 km	MPC · JPL
175816	1999 RZ_{230}	—	September 8, 1999	Catalina	CSS	·	1.5 km	MPC · JPL
175817	1999 RV_{236}	—	September 8, 1999	Catalina	CSS	·	6.3 km	MPC · JPL
175818	1999 SZ	—	September 16, 1999	Kitt Peak	Spacewatch	V	950 m	MPC · JPL
175819	1999 TN_{18}	—	October 14, 1999	Xinglong	SCAP	NYS	1.7 km	MPC · JPL
175820	1999 TS_{25}	—	October 3, 1999	Socorro	LINEAR	·	1.9 km	MPC · JPL
175821	1999 TB_{31}	—	October 4, 1999	Socorro	LINEAR	·	1.9 km	MPC · JPL
175822	1999 TZ_{36}	—	October 15, 1999	Anderson Mesa	LONEOS	·	2.4 km	MPC · JPL
175823	1999 TA_{45}	—	October 3, 1999	Kitt Peak	Spacewatch	·	1.3 km	MPC · JPL
175824	1999 TN_{51}	—	October 4, 1999	Kitt Peak	Spacewatch	·	1.8 km	MPC · JPL
175825	1999 TR_{56}	—	October 6, 1999	Kitt Peak	Spacewatch	NYS	1.7 km	MPC · JPL
175826	1999 TF_{61}	—	October 7, 1999	Kitt Peak	Spacewatch	·	2.2 km	MPC · JPL
175827	1999 TS_{72}	—	October 9, 1999	Kitt Peak	Spacewatch	·	940 m	MPC · JPL
175828	1999 TA_{95}	—	October 2, 1999	Socorro	LINEAR	·	2.0 km	MPC · JPL
175829	1999 TW_{98}	—	October 2, 1999	Socorro	LINEAR	·	1.2 km	MPC · JPL
175830	1999 TH_{103}	—	October 3, 1999	Socorro	LINEAR	·	1.8 km	MPC · JPL
175831	1999 TK_{117}	—	October 4, 1999	Socorro	LINEAR	NYS	1.5 km	MPC · JPL
175832	1999 TL_{119}	—	October 4, 1999	Socorro	LINEAR	·	1.5 km	MPC · JPL
175833	1999 TZ_{120}	—	October 4, 1999	Socorro	LINEAR	·	1.5 km	MPC · JPL
175834	1999 TC_{129}	—	October 6, 1999	Socorro	LINEAR	·	1.6 km	MPC · JPL
175835	1999 TB_{134}	—	October 6, 1999	Socorro	LINEAR	MAS	1.0 km	MPC · JPL
175836	1999 TZ_{135}	—	October 6, 1999	Socorro	LINEAR	·	2.6 km	MPC · JPL
175837	1999 TF_{138}	—	October 6, 1999	Socorro	LINEAR	·	1.2 km	MPC · JPL
175838	1999 TN_{149}	—	October 7, 1999	Socorro	LINEAR	·	1.1 km	MPC · JPL
175839	1999 TA_{178}	—	October 10, 1999	Socorro	LINEAR	SUL	3.1 km	MPC · JPL
175840	1999 TJ_{185}	—	October 12, 1999	Socorro	LINEAR	·	1.3 km	MPC · JPL
175841	1999 TR_{192}	—	October 12, 1999	Socorro	LINEAR	·	2.3 km	MPC · JPL
175842	1999 TA_{200}	—	October 12, 1999	Socorro	LINEAR	·	1.7 km	MPC · JPL
175843	1999 TH_{205}	—	October 13, 1999	Socorro	LINEAR	V	990 m	MPC · JPL
175844	1999 TC_{216}	—	October 15, 1999	Socorro	LINEAR	NYS	1.7 km	MPC · JPL
175845	1999 TF_{234}	—	October 3, 1999	Socorro	LINEAR	V	1.1 km	MPC · JPL
175846	1999 TO_{285}	—	October 9, 1999	Socorro	LINEAR	NYS	1.7 km	MPC · JPL
175847	1999 TF_{293}	—	October 12, 1999	Socorro	LINEAR	·	3.1 km	MPC · JPL
175848	1999 TG_{295}	—	October 1, 1999	Catalina	CSS	·	1.9 km	MPC · JPL
175849	1999 TA_{302}	—	October 3, 1999	Kitt Peak	Spacewatch	V	980 m	MPC · JPL
175850	1999 TG_{321}	—	October 11, 1999	Kitt Peak	Spacewatch	·	1.6 km	MPC · JPL
175851	1999 UF_{5}	—	October 29, 1999	Socorro	LINEAR	H	870 m	MPC · JPL
175852	1999 UQ_{14}	—	October 29, 1999	Catalina	CSS	·	1.6 km	MPC · JPL
175853	1999 UL_{27}	—	October 30, 1999	Kitt Peak	Spacewatch	·	1.5 km	MPC · JPL
175854	1999 UX_{43}	—	October 29, 1999	Catalina	CSS	V	1.1 km	MPC · JPL
175855	1999 UV_{47}	—	October 30, 1999	Catalina	CSS	·	1.7 km	MPC · JPL
175856	1999 UQ_{56}	—	October 28, 1999	Catalina	CSS	V	1.3 km	MPC · JPL
175857	1999 UZ_{59}	—	October 31, 1999	Catalina	CSS	V	1.1 km	MPC · JPL
175858	1999 VL	—	November 2, 1999	Oaxaca	Roe, J. M.	MAS	1.3 km	MPC · JPL
175859	1999 VE_{3}	—	November 1, 1999	Kitt Peak	Spacewatch	MAS	940 m	MPC · JPL
175860	1999 VH_{16}	—	November 2, 1999	Kitt Peak	Spacewatch	·	1.7 km	MPC · JPL
175861	1999 VW_{37}	—	November 3, 1999	Socorro	LINEAR	·	2.4 km	MPC · JPL
175862	1999 VC_{41}	—	November 1, 1999	Kitt Peak	Spacewatch	·	1.6 km	MPC · JPL
175863	1999 VA_{65}	—	November 4, 1999	Socorro	LINEAR	·	2.0 km	MPC · JPL
175864	1999 VC_{65}	—	November 4, 1999	Socorro	LINEAR	·	1.7 km	MPC · JPL
175865	1999 VW_{65}	—	November 4, 1999	Socorro	LINEAR	·	1.9 km	MPC · JPL
175866	1999 VV_{69}	—	November 4, 1999	Socorro	LINEAR	·	1.8 km	MPC · JPL
175867	1999 VW_{86}	—	November 7, 1999	Socorro	LINEAR	·	3.2 km	MPC · JPL
175868	1999 VH_{91}	—	November 5, 1999	Socorro	LINEAR	·	1.3 km	MPC · JPL
175869	1999 VD_{123}	—	November 5, 1999	Kitt Peak	Spacewatch	·	2.1 km	MPC · JPL
175870	1999 VU_{124}	—	November 10, 1999	Kitt Peak	Spacewatch	·	1.6 km	MPC · JPL
175871	1999 VV_{125}	—	November 6, 1999	Kitt Peak	Spacewatch	MAS	900 m	MPC · JPL
175872	1999 VN_{132}	—	November 9, 1999	Kitt Peak	Spacewatch	·	1.6 km	MPC · JPL
175873	1999 VL_{136}	—	November 9, 1999	Socorro	LINEAR	·	3.7 km	MPC · JPL
175874	1999 VQ_{139}	—	November 10, 1999	Kitt Peak	Spacewatch	·	930 m	MPC · JPL
175875	1999 VG_{148}	—	November 14, 1999	Socorro	LINEAR	·	2.4 km	MPC · JPL
175876	1999 VS_{153}	—	November 11, 1999	Kitt Peak	Spacewatch	·	1.4 km	MPC · JPL
175877	1999 VC_{168}	—	November 14, 1999	Socorro	LINEAR	NYS	1.9 km	MPC · JPL
175878	1999 VZ_{168}	—	November 14, 1999	Socorro	LINEAR	NYS	1.6 km	MPC · JPL
175879	1999 VQ_{182}	—	November 9, 1999	Socorro	LINEAR	·	1.3 km	MPC · JPL
175880	1999 VD_{185}	—	November 15, 1999	Socorro	LINEAR	slow	1.9 km	MPC · JPL
175881	1999 VJ_{188}	—	November 15, 1999	Socorro	LINEAR	NYS	1.8 km	MPC · JPL
175882	1999 VG_{191}	—	November 9, 1999	Socorro	LINEAR	·	2.2 km	MPC · JPL
175883	1999 VP_{200}	—	November 6, 1999	Catalina	CSS	MAR	2.0 km	MPC · JPL
175884	1999 VJ_{202}	—	November 5, 1999	Socorro	LINEAR	V	1.0 km	MPC · JPL
175885	1999 VE_{211}	—	November 14, 1999	Socorro	LINEAR	·	1.8 km	MPC · JPL
175886	1999 VV_{212}	—	November 12, 1999	Socorro	LINEAR	·	1.6 km	MPC · JPL
175887	1999 WL_{8}	—	November 29, 1999	Monte Agliale	S. Donati	V	920 m	MPC · JPL
175888	1999 WQ_{14}	—	November 28, 1999	Kitt Peak	Spacewatch	MAS	1.2 km	MPC · JPL
175889	1999 WJ_{16}	—	November 29, 1999	Kitt Peak	Spacewatch	·	1.3 km	MPC · JPL
175890	1999 XB_{5}	—	December 4, 1999	Catalina	CSS	NYS	2.1 km	MPC · JPL
175891	1999 XG_{43}	—	December 7, 1999	Socorro	LINEAR	·	1.6 km	MPC · JPL
175892	1999 XJ_{47}	—	December 7, 1999	Socorro	LINEAR	·	1.9 km	MPC · JPL
175893	1999 XN_{51}	—	December 7, 1999	Socorro	LINEAR	(5)	1.7 km	MPC · JPL
175894	1999 XK_{54}	—	December 7, 1999	Socorro	LINEAR	MAS	1.1 km	MPC · JPL
175895	1999 XJ_{122}	—	December 7, 1999	Catalina	CSS	·	2.7 km	MPC · JPL
175896	1999 XN_{134}	—	December 12, 1999	Socorro	LINEAR	·	2.0 km	MPC · JPL
175897	1999 XG_{139}	—	December 6, 1999	Kitt Peak	Spacewatch	(5)	2.4 km	MPC · JPL
175898	1999 XL_{185}	—	December 12, 1999	Socorro	LINEAR	·	1.8 km	MPC · JPL
175899	1999 XW_{205}	—	December 12, 1999	Socorro	LINEAR	HNS	1.8 km	MPC · JPL
175900	1999 XM_{217}	—	December 13, 1999	Kitt Peak	Spacewatch	·	1.7 km	MPC · JPL

== 175901–176000 ==
back to top

Designation			Discovery			Properties		Ref
Permanent	Provisional	Named after	Date	Site	Discoverer(s)	Category	Diam.	Ref
175901	1999 XT_{230}	—	December 7, 1999	Socorro	LINEAR	NYS	1.2 km	MPC · JPL
175902	1999 YP_{3}	—	December 19, 1999	Socorro	LINEAR	H	1.3 km	MPC · JPL
175903	1999 YL_{5}	—	December 29, 1999	EverStaR	Everstar	·	2.0 km	MPC · JPL
175904	1999 YX_{7}	—	December 27, 1999	Kitt Peak	Spacewatch	·	1.4 km	MPC · JPL
175905	1999 YD_{23}	—	December 31, 1999	Catalina	CSS	·	2.7 km	MPC · JPL
175906	1999 YG_{27}	—	December 31, 1999	Kitt Peak	Spacewatch	·	1.1 km	MPC · JPL
175907	2000 AR_{36}	—	January 3, 2000	Socorro	LINEAR	·	1.6 km	MPC · JPL
175908	2000 AK_{43}	—	January 5, 2000	Socorro	LINEAR	H	1.1 km	MPC · JPL
175909	2000 AE_{61}	—	January 4, 2000	Socorro	LINEAR	·	3.1 km	MPC · JPL
175910	2000 AQ_{154}	—	January 3, 2000	Socorro	LINEAR	·	3.5 km	MPC · JPL
175911	2000 AT_{250}	—	January 3, 2000	Kitt Peak	Spacewatch	·	1.3 km	MPC · JPL
175912	2000 AU_{251}	—	January 6, 2000	Kitt Peak	Spacewatch	·	1.6 km	MPC · JPL
175913	2000 BM_{32}	—	January 28, 2000	Kitt Peak	Spacewatch	MIS	3.8 km	MPC · JPL
175914	2000 BC_{39}	—	January 27, 2000	Kitt Peak	Spacewatch	·	1.2 km	MPC · JPL
175915	2000 CA_{41}	—	February 2, 2000	Socorro	LINEAR	·	5.5 km	MPC · JPL
175916	2000 CQ_{48}	—	February 2, 2000	Socorro	LINEAR	·	2.7 km	MPC · JPL
175917	2000 CX_{67}	—	February 1, 2000	Kitt Peak	Spacewatch	MAS	1.2 km	MPC · JPL
175918	2000 CE_{102}	—	February 2, 2000	Socorro	LINEAR	·	2.3 km	MPC · JPL
175919	2000 CL_{112}	—	February 7, 2000	Catalina	CSS	·	2.9 km	MPC · JPL
175920 Francisnimmo	2000 CO_{118}	Francisnimmo	February 5, 2000	Kitt Peak	M. W. Buie	·	1.5 km	MPC · JPL
175921	2000 DM_{1}	—	February 16, 2000	Catalina	CSS	APO +1km	1.0 km	MPC · JPL
175922	2000 DY_{12}	—	February 27, 2000	Kitt Peak	Spacewatch	·	1.4 km	MPC · JPL
175923	2000 DW_{16}	—	February 29, 2000	Socorro	LINEAR	·	2.5 km	MPC · JPL
175924	2000 DK_{38}	—	February 29, 2000	Socorro	LINEAR	·	1.7 km	MPC · JPL
175925	2000 DU_{40}	—	February 29, 2000	Socorro	LINEAR	·	1.2 km	MPC · JPL
175926	2000 DV_{47}	—	February 29, 2000	Socorro	LINEAR	·	1.4 km	MPC · JPL
175927	2000 DW_{54}	—	February 29, 2000	Socorro	LINEAR	·	1.5 km	MPC · JPL
175928	2000 DE_{79}	—	February 29, 2000	Socorro	LINEAR	H	990 m	MPC · JPL
175929	2000 DB_{88}	—	February 29, 2000	Socorro	LINEAR	·	3.0 km	MPC · JPL
175930	2000 DM_{91}	—	February 27, 2000	Kitt Peak	Spacewatch	·	2.7 km	MPC · JPL
175931	2000 DD_{105}	—	February 29, 2000	Socorro	LINEAR	·	1.6 km	MPC · JPL
175932	2000 DT_{117}	—	February 25, 2000	Kitt Peak	Spacewatch	(5)	1.8 km	MPC · JPL
175933	2000 EA_{10}	—	March 3, 2000	Socorro	LINEAR	·	1.5 km	MPC · JPL
175934	2000 ES_{26}	—	March 9, 2000	Socorro	LINEAR	H	1.0 km	MPC · JPL
175935	2000 EX_{52}	—	March 3, 2000	Kitt Peak	Spacewatch	·	1.1 km	MPC · JPL
175936	2000 EJ_{73}	—	March 10, 2000	Kitt Peak	Spacewatch	3:2 · SHU	6.6 km	MPC · JPL
175937	2000 EN_{118}	—	March 11, 2000	Anderson Mesa	LONEOS	·	4.4 km	MPC · JPL
175938	2000 EE_{119}	—	March 11, 2000	Anderson Mesa	LONEOS	·	1.5 km	MPC · JPL
175939	2000 EF_{128}	—	March 11, 2000	Anderson Mesa	LONEOS	·	1.5 km	MPC · JPL
175940	2000 EY_{200}	—	March 3, 2000	Catalina	CSS	H	970 m	MPC · JPL
175941	2000 FN_{27}	—	March 27, 2000	Anderson Mesa	LONEOS	JUN	1.8 km	MPC · JPL
175942	2000 FC_{38}	—	March 29, 2000	Socorro	LINEAR	·	2.0 km	MPC · JPL
175943	2000 GE_{1}	—	April 2, 2000	Socorro	LINEAR	·	2.9 km	MPC · JPL
175944	2000 GH_{4}	—	April 3, 2000	Socorro	LINEAR	H	940 m	MPC · JPL
175945	2000 GC_{13}	—	April 5, 2000	Socorro	LINEAR	·	4.1 km	MPC · JPL
175946	2000 GG_{16}	—	April 5, 2000	Socorro	LINEAR	·	3.1 km	MPC · JPL
175947	2000 GL_{20}	—	April 5, 2000	Socorro	LINEAR	·	1.7 km	MPC · JPL
175948	2000 GR_{25}	—	April 5, 2000	Socorro	LINEAR	·	2.6 km	MPC · JPL
175949	2000 GF_{93}	—	April 5, 2000	Socorro	LINEAR	·	3.5 km	MPC · JPL
175950	2000 GJ_{105}	—	April 7, 2000	Socorro	LINEAR	·	2.3 km	MPC · JPL
175951	2000 GL_{141}	—	April 7, 2000	Anderson Mesa	LONEOS	·	2.1 km	MPC · JPL
175952	2000 GS_{166}	—	April 5, 2000	Socorro	LINEAR	·	3.1 km	MPC · JPL
175953	2000 GQ_{182}	—	April 3, 2000	Kitt Peak	Spacewatch	·	1.9 km	MPC · JPL
175954	2000 GE_{186}	—	April 5, 2000	Anderson Mesa	LONEOS	·	2.0 km	MPC · JPL
175955	2000 HS_{19}	—	April 27, 2000	Kitt Peak	Spacewatch	WIT	1.5 km	MPC · JPL
175956	2000 HC_{59}	—	April 25, 2000	Anderson Mesa	LONEOS	·	1.7 km	MPC · JPL
175957	2000 HQ_{59}	—	April 25, 2000	Anderson Mesa	LONEOS	·	2.0 km	MPC · JPL
175958	2000 HZ_{78}	—	April 28, 2000	Anderson Mesa	LONEOS	JUN · slow	1.9 km	MPC · JPL
175959	2000 HS_{84}	—	April 30, 2000	Anderson Mesa	LONEOS	·	2.3 km	MPC · JPL
175960	2000 HD_{85}	—	April 30, 2000	Haleakala	NEAT	·	2.8 km	MPC · JPL
175961	2000 JK_{1}	—	May 2, 2000	Socorro	LINEAR	·	3.9 km	MPC · JPL
175962	2000 JR_{42}	—	May 7, 2000	Socorro	LINEAR	·	3.1 km	MPC · JPL
175963	2000 JF_{67}	—	May 4, 2000	Kitt Peak	Spacewatch	·	1.8 km	MPC · JPL
175964	2000 JD_{79}	—	May 5, 2000	Socorro	LINEAR	·	5.4 km	MPC · JPL
175965	2000 JR_{81}	—	May 7, 2000	Socorro	LINEAR	·	1.7 km	MPC · JPL
175966	2000 KB_{49}	—	May 28, 2000	Kitt Peak	Spacewatch	·	2.1 km	MPC · JPL
175967	2000 KL_{54}	—	May 27, 2000	Anderson Mesa	LONEOS	EUN	2.4 km	MPC · JPL
175968	2000 LB_{13}	—	June 5, 2000	Socorro	LINEAR	·	2.9 km	MPC · JPL
175969	2000 LQ_{22}	—	June 7, 2000	Bergisch Gladbach	W. Bickel	·	3.7 km	MPC · JPL
175970	2000 LM_{24}	—	June 1, 2000	Socorro	LINEAR	·	3.4 km	MPC · JPL
175971	2000 LW_{34}	—	June 1, 2000	Anderson Mesa	LONEOS	·	2.5 km	MPC · JPL
175972	2000 LX_{37}	—	June 7, 2000	Kitt Peak	Spacewatch	·	3.1 km	MPC · JPL
175973	2000 NB_{13}	—	July 5, 2000	Anderson Mesa	LONEOS	·	1.9 km	MPC · JPL
175974	2000 NC_{13}	—	July 5, 2000	Anderson Mesa	LONEOS	·	6.9 km	MPC · JPL
175975	2000 OB_{4}	—	July 24, 2000	Socorro	LINEAR	·	1.3 km	MPC · JPL
175976	2000 OJ_{38}	—	July 30, 2000	Socorro	LINEAR	·	5.4 km	MPC · JPL
175977	2000 OO_{41}	—	July 30, 2000	Socorro	LINEAR	·	3.5 km	MPC · JPL
175978	2000 PL_{10}	—	August 1, 2000	Socorro	LINEAR	·	3.8 km	MPC · JPL
175979	2000 PH_{26}	—	August 5, 2000	Haleakala	NEAT	·	9.4 km	MPC · JPL
175980	2000 QV_{6}	—	August 24, 2000	Socorro	LINEAR	TIN	3.8 km	MPC · JPL
175981	2000 QO_{29}	—	August 24, 2000	Socorro	LINEAR	BRA	3.4 km	MPC · JPL
175982	2000 QS_{40}	—	August 24, 2000	Socorro	LINEAR	·	4.7 km	MPC · JPL
175983	2000 QN_{43}	—	August 24, 2000	Socorro	LINEAR	·	1.0 km	MPC · JPL
175984	2000 QN_{48}	—	August 24, 2000	Socorro	LINEAR	·	1.2 km	MPC · JPL
175985	2000 QE_{52}	—	August 24, 2000	Socorro	LINEAR	·	3.4 km	MPC · JPL
175986	2000 QN_{71}	—	August 24, 2000	Socorro	LINEAR	EOS	3.0 km	MPC · JPL
175987	2000 QF_{74}	—	August 24, 2000	Socorro	LINEAR	·	3.8 km	MPC · JPL
175988	2000 QL_{79}	—	August 24, 2000	Socorro	LINEAR	·	4.7 km	MPC · JPL
175989	2000 QG_{94}	—	August 26, 2000	Socorro	LINEAR	TIR	5.0 km	MPC · JPL
175990	2000 QQ_{119}	—	August 25, 2000	Socorro	LINEAR	·	5.9 km	MPC · JPL
175991	2000 QN_{131}	—	August 24, 2000	Socorro	LINEAR	·	8.5 km	MPC · JPL
175992	2000 QC_{134}	—	August 26, 2000	Socorro	LINEAR	·	3.0 km	MPC · JPL
175993	2000 QB_{145}	—	August 31, 2000	Socorro	LINEAR	·	4.5 km	MPC · JPL
175994	2000 QM_{155}	—	August 31, 2000	Socorro	LINEAR	LIX	6.1 km	MPC · JPL
175995	2000 QO_{155}	—	August 31, 2000	Socorro	LINEAR	·	3.0 km	MPC · JPL
175996	2000 QK_{156}	—	August 31, 2000	Socorro	LINEAR	·	3.3 km	MPC · JPL
175997	2000 QZ_{159}	—	August 31, 2000	Socorro	LINEAR	·	3.4 km	MPC · JPL
175998	2000 QN_{168}	—	August 31, 2000	Socorro	LINEAR	·	950 m	MPC · JPL
175999	2000 QW_{173}	—	August 31, 2000	Socorro	LINEAR	·	5.3 km	MPC · JPL
176000	2000 QL_{213}	—	August 31, 2000	Socorro	LINEAR	·	7.7 km	MPC · JPL

back to top

== See also ==
- Meanings of minor-planet names: 175001–176000
