= Meanings of minor-planet names: 174001–175000 =

As minor planet discoveries are confirmed, they are given a permanent number by the IAU's Minor Planet Center (MPC), and the discoverers can then submit names for them, following the IAU's naming conventions. The list below concerns those minor planets in the specified number-range that have received names, and explains the meanings of those names.

Official naming citations of newly named small Solar System bodies are approved and published in a bulletin by IAU's Working Group for Small Bodies Nomenclature (WGSBN). Before May 2021, citations were published in MPC's Minor Planet Circulars for many decades. Recent citations can also be found on the JPL Small-Body Database (SBDB). Until his death in 2016, German astronomer Lutz D. Schmadel compiled these citations into the Dictionary of Minor Planet Names (DMP) and regularly updated the collection.

Based on Paul Herget's The Names of the Minor Planets, Schmadel also researched the unclear origin of numerous asteroids, most of which had been named prior to World War II. This article incorporates text from this source, which is in the public domain: SBDB New namings may only be added to this list below after official publication as the preannouncement of names is condemned. The WGSBN publishes a comprehensive guideline for the naming rules of non-cometary small Solar System bodies.

== 174001–174100 ==
Named minor planet	Provisional	This minor planet was named for...	Ref · Catalog
There are no named minor planets in this number range

== 174101–174200 ==
back to top

Named minor planet	Provisional	This minor planet was named for...	Ref · Catalog
There are no named minor planets in this number range

== 174201–174300 ==
back to top

Named minor planet	Provisional	This minor planet was named for...	Ref · Catalog
174281 Lonský	2002 SC_{29}	Vladimír Lonský (born 1953), a heart surgeon, works in the Faculty Hospital in Olomouc, Czech Republic	JPL · 174281

== 174301–174400 ==
back to top

Named minor planet	Provisional	This minor planet was named for...	Ref · Catalog
174361 Rickwhite	2002 TV_{315}	Richard L. White (born 1953), American astronomer with the Sloan Digital Sky Survey	JPL · 174361
174362 Bethwillman	2002 TE_{324}	Beth Willman (born 1976), American astronomer with the Sloan Digital Sky Survey	JPL · 174362
174363 Donyork	2002 TW_{343}	Don York (born 1944), American astronomer with the Sloan Digital Sky Survey	JPL · 174363
174364 Zakamska	2002 TH_{369}	Nadia Zakamska (born 1979), Russian-American astrophysicist with the Sloan Digital Sky Survey	JPL · 174364
174365 Zibetti	2002 TF_{371}	Stefano Zibetti (born 1976), Italian astronomer and a contributor to the Sloan Digital Sky Survey	JPL · 174365

== 174401–174500 ==
back to top

Named minor planet	Provisional	This minor planet was named for...	Ref · Catalog
174466 Zucker	2002 YO_{36}	Daniel Zucker (born 1968), American astronomer with the Sloan Digital Sky Survey	JPL · 174466

== 174501–174600 ==
back to top

Named minor planet	Provisional	This minor planet was named for...	Ref · Catalog
174515 Pamelaivezić	2003 BN_{92}	Pamela Ivezic (born 1961), an American singer, musicologist, music educator, a patron of astronomy	JPL · 174515
174567 Varda	2003 MW_{12}	Varda the star-kindler, is the queen of the stars in Tolkien's legendarium	JPL · 174567

== 174601–174700 ==
back to top

Named minor planet	Provisional	This minor planet was named for...	Ref · Catalog
There are no named minor planets in this number range

== 174701–174800 ==
back to top

Named minor planet	Provisional	This minor planet was named for...	Ref · Catalog
There are no named minor planets in this number range

== 174801–174900 ==
back to top

Named minor planet	Provisional	This minor planet was named for...	Ref · Catalog
174801 Etscorn	2003 WZ_{165}	Frank T. Etscorn (born 1945), American professor of psychology at New Mexico Institute of Mining and Technology, inventor of the nicotine patch and amateur astronomer, founder of the university's Frank T. Etscorn Campus Observatory	JPL · 174801

== 174901–175000 ==
back to top

Named minor planet	Provisional	This minor planet was named for...	Ref · Catalog
There are no named minor planets in this number range

back to top

Preceded by 173,001–174,000	Meanings of minor-planet names List of minor planets: 174,001–175,000	Succeeded by 175,001–176,000
