= List of minor planets: 174001–175000 =

The following is a partial list of minor planets, running from minor-planet number 174001 through 175000, inclusive. The primary data for this and other partial lists is based on JPL's "Small-Body Orbital Elements" and data available from the Minor Planet Center. Critical list information is also provided by the MPC, unless otherwise specified from Lowell Observatory. A detailed description of the table's columns and additional sources are given on the main page including a complete list of every page in this series, and a statistical break-up on the dynamical classification of minor planets.

Also see the summary list of all named bodies in numerical and alphabetical order, and the corresponding naming citations for the number range of this particular list. New namings may only be added to this list after official publication, as the preannouncement of names is condemned by the Working Group for Small Bodies Nomenclature of the International Astronomical Union.

Near-Earth obj.	MBA (inner)	MBA (outer)	Centaur
Mars-crosser	MBA (middle)	Jupiter trojan	Trans-Neptunian obj.
Unclassified

== 174001–174100 ==
Designation			Discovery			Properties		Ref
Permanent	Provisional	Named after	Date	Site	Discoverer(s)	Category	Diam.	Ref
174001	2001 XJ_{235}	—	December 15, 2001	Socorro	LINEAR	EOS	3.0 km	MPC · JPL
174002	2001 XV_{246}	—	December 15, 2001	Socorro	LINEAR	·	3.8 km	MPC · JPL
174003	2001 XF_{249}	—	December 14, 2001	Kitt Peak	Spacewatch	·	3.1 km	MPC · JPL
174004	2001 XC_{261}	—	December 11, 2001	Socorro	LINEAR	·	4.3 km	MPC · JPL
174005	2001 XU_{262}	—	December 13, 2001	Palomar	NEAT	·	2.2 km	MPC · JPL
174006	2001 YT_{7}	—	December 17, 2001	Socorro	LINEAR	·	5.7 km	MPC · JPL
174007	2001 YW_{7}	—	December 17, 2001	Socorro	LINEAR	·	5.4 km	MPC · JPL
174008	2001 YW_{8}	—	December 17, 2001	Socorro	LINEAR	HYG	3.6 km	MPC · JPL
174009	2001 YV_{9}	—	December 17, 2001	Socorro	LINEAR	·	6.6 km	MPC · JPL
174010	2001 YC_{10}	—	December 17, 2001	Socorro	LINEAR	·	2.7 km	MPC · JPL
174011	2001 YT_{15}	—	December 17, 2001	Socorro	LINEAR	·	5.0 km	MPC · JPL
174012	2001 YL_{22}	—	December 18, 2001	Socorro	LINEAR	THM	3.3 km	MPC · JPL
174013	2001 YQ_{36}	—	December 18, 2001	Socorro	LINEAR	·	3.8 km	MPC · JPL
174014	2001 YS_{43}	—	December 18, 2001	Socorro	LINEAR	·	3.5 km	MPC · JPL
174015	2001 YN_{57}	—	December 18, 2001	Socorro	LINEAR	·	3.1 km	MPC · JPL
174016	2001 YW_{84}	—	December 18, 2001	Socorro	LINEAR	·	6.0 km	MPC · JPL
174017	2001 YJ_{93}	—	December 18, 2001	Kitt Peak	Spacewatch	·	2.7 km	MPC · JPL
174018	2001 YD_{105}	—	December 17, 2001	Socorro	LINEAR	·	4.7 km	MPC · JPL
174019	2001 YU_{109}	—	December 18, 2001	Socorro	LINEAR	·	6.3 km	MPC · JPL
174020	2001 YE_{122}	—	December 17, 2001	Socorro	LINEAR	T_{j} (2.98)	7.9 km	MPC · JPL
174021	2001 YE_{123}	—	December 17, 2001	Socorro	LINEAR	LIX	6.8 km	MPC · JPL
174022	2001 YP_{124}	—	December 17, 2001	Socorro	LINEAR	·	3.2 km	MPC · JPL
174023	2001 YT_{132}	—	December 20, 2001	Socorro	LINEAR	·	5.3 km	MPC · JPL
174024	2001 YB_{134}	—	December 17, 2001	Socorro	LINEAR	·	5.0 km	MPC · JPL
174025	2001 YV_{137}	—	December 22, 2001	Socorro	LINEAR	·	4.2 km	MPC · JPL
174026	2001 YD_{141}	—	December 17, 2001	Socorro	LINEAR	·	3.0 km	MPC · JPL
174027	2001 YZ_{145}	—	December 18, 2001	Anderson Mesa	LONEOS	·	4.6 km	MPC · JPL
174028	2001 YM_{150}	—	December 19, 2001	Socorro	LINEAR	LIX	5.9 km	MPC · JPL
174029	2001 YF_{154}	—	December 19, 2001	Palomar	NEAT	·	6.9 km	MPC · JPL
174030	2001 YX_{154}	—	December 19, 2001	Palomar	NEAT	·	4.1 km	MPC · JPL
174031	2002 AR_{27}	—	January 7, 2002	Anderson Mesa	LONEOS	·	6.6 km	MPC · JPL
174032	2002 AH_{36}	—	January 9, 2002	Socorro	LINEAR	·	3.7 km	MPC · JPL
174033	2002 AW_{42}	—	January 9, 2002	Socorro	LINEAR	·	4.1 km	MPC · JPL
174034	2002 AQ_{47}	—	January 9, 2002	Socorro	LINEAR	·	4.9 km	MPC · JPL
174035	2002 AP_{86}	—	January 9, 2002	Socorro	LINEAR	EOS	3.9 km	MPC · JPL
174036	2002 AP_{110}	—	January 9, 2002	Socorro	LINEAR	·	5.6 km	MPC · JPL
174037	2002 AY_{111}	—	January 9, 2002	Socorro	LINEAR	·	7.9 km	MPC · JPL
174038	2002 AD_{116}	—	January 9, 2002	Socorro	LINEAR	LUT	9.3 km	MPC · JPL
174039	2002 AO_{123}	—	January 9, 2002	Socorro	LINEAR	·	6.5 km	MPC · JPL
174040	2002 AY_{132}	—	January 8, 2002	Socorro	LINEAR	VER	4.4 km	MPC · JPL
174041	2002 AX_{135}	—	January 9, 2002	Socorro	LINEAR	·	8.0 km	MPC · JPL
174042	2002 AD_{138}	—	January 9, 2002	Socorro	LINEAR	·	6.5 km	MPC · JPL
174043	2002 AZ_{169}	—	January 14, 2002	Socorro	LINEAR	·	4.3 km	MPC · JPL
174044	2002 AY_{171}	—	January 14, 2002	Socorro	LINEAR	CYB	6.8 km	MPC · JPL
174045	2002 AU_{182}	—	January 5, 2002	Anderson Mesa	LONEOS	HYG	4.8 km	MPC · JPL
174046	2002 BU_{8}	—	January 18, 2002	Socorro	LINEAR	·	5.9 km	MPC · JPL
174047	2002 BW_{12}	—	January 18, 2002	Socorro	LINEAR	CYB	6.7 km	MPC · JPL
174048	2002 BP_{17}	—	January 21, 2002	Socorro	LINEAR	·	4.2 km	MPC · JPL
174049	2002 BQ_{23}	—	January 23, 2002	Socorro	LINEAR	·	6.9 km	MPC · JPL
174050	2002 CC_{19}	—	February 10, 2002	Anderson Mesa	LONEOS	AMO +1km	1.1 km	MPC · JPL
174051	2002 CW_{19}	—	February 4, 2002	Palomar	NEAT	VER	4.1 km	MPC · JPL
174052	2002 CB_{34}	—	February 6, 2002	Socorro	LINEAR	·	5.8 km	MPC · JPL
174053	2002 CF_{54}	—	February 7, 2002	Socorro	LINEAR	CYB	8.7 km	MPC · JPL
174054	2002 CC_{57}	—	February 7, 2002	Socorro	LINEAR	·	1.2 km	MPC · JPL
174055	2002 CE_{75}	—	February 7, 2002	Socorro	LINEAR	·	1.1 km	MPC · JPL
174056	2002 CW_{104}	—	February 7, 2002	Socorro	LINEAR	·	1.3 km	MPC · JPL
174057	2002 CG_{127}	—	February 7, 2002	Socorro	LINEAR	HYG	4.4 km	MPC · JPL
174058	2002 CD_{160}	—	February 8, 2002	Socorro	LINEAR	·	5.9 km	MPC · JPL
174059	2002 CJ_{163}	—	February 8, 2002	Socorro	LINEAR	·	7.8 km	MPC · JPL
174060	2002 CL_{245}	—	February 14, 2002	Socorro	LINEAR	·	5.6 km	MPC · JPL
174061	2002 CU_{258}	—	February 6, 2002	Palomar	NEAT	·	3.9 km	MPC · JPL
174062	2002 CL_{302}	—	February 11, 2002	Socorro	LINEAR	THM ·	3.4 km	MPC · JPL
174063	2002 CV_{306}	—	February 7, 2002	Socorro	LINEAR	·	3.9 km	MPC · JPL
174064	2002 DM_{15}	—	February 16, 2002	Palomar	NEAT	·	4.5 km	MPC · JPL
174065	2002 EH_{4}	—	March 10, 2002	Cima Ekar	ADAS	THM	4.9 km	MPC · JPL
174066	2002 EH_{34}	—	March 11, 2002	Palomar	NEAT	·	1.4 km	MPC · JPL
174067	2002 ER_{53}	—	March 13, 2002	Socorro	LINEAR	·	920 m	MPC · JPL
174068	2002 EG_{71}	—	March 13, 2002	Socorro	LINEAR	V	1.3 km	MPC · JPL
174069	2002 EJ_{71}	—	March 13, 2002	Socorro	LINEAR	·	1.3 km	MPC · JPL
174070	2002 EV_{82}	—	March 13, 2002	Palomar	NEAT	NYS	1.3 km	MPC · JPL
174071	2002 ER_{99}	—	March 3, 2002	Haleakala	NEAT	·	1.4 km	MPC · JPL
174072	2002 EA_{111}	—	March 9, 2002	Anderson Mesa	LONEOS	(2076)	1.9 km	MPC · JPL
174073	2002 EA_{129}	—	March 13, 2002	Kitt Peak	Spacewatch	·	960 m	MPC · JPL
174074	2002 EO_{133}	—	March 13, 2002	Socorro	LINEAR	3:2	8.1 km	MPC · JPL
174075	2002 EF_{153}	—	March 15, 2002	Palomar	NEAT	·	2.6 km	MPC · JPL
174076	2002 FH_{1}	—	March 18, 2002	Bohyunsan	Bohyunsan	·	960 m	MPC · JPL
174077	2002 FP_{21}	—	March 19, 2002	Anderson Mesa	LONEOS	3:2	9.0 km	MPC · JPL
174078	2002 GB_{15}	—	April 15, 2002	Socorro	LINEAR	·	1.1 km	MPC · JPL
174079	2002 GG_{35}	—	April 1, 2002	Palomar	NEAT	MAS	1.1 km	MPC · JPL
174080	2002 GY_{36}	—	April 2, 2002	Palomar	NEAT	·	5.3 km	MPC · JPL
174081	2002 GU_{37}	—	April 3, 2002	Kitt Peak	Spacewatch	·	930 m	MPC · JPL
174082	2002 GX_{44}	—	April 4, 2002	Palomar	NEAT	·	1.5 km	MPC · JPL
174083	2002 GF_{63}	—	April 8, 2002	Palomar	NEAT	(2076)	2.6 km	MPC · JPL
174084	2002 GX_{71}	—	April 9, 2002	Anderson Mesa	LONEOS	·	1.4 km	MPC · JPL
174085	2002 GU_{98}	—	April 10, 2002	Socorro	LINEAR	·	1.4 km	MPC · JPL
174086	2002 GO_{107}	—	April 11, 2002	Socorro	LINEAR	·	1.5 km	MPC · JPL
174087	2002 GT_{110}	—	April 10, 2002	Socorro	LINEAR	·	1.2 km	MPC · JPL
174088	2002 GE_{130}	—	April 12, 2002	Socorro	LINEAR	·	1.4 km	MPC · JPL
174089	2002 GX_{137}	—	April 12, 2002	Socorro	LINEAR	3:2	9.1 km	MPC · JPL
174090	2002 GY_{142}	—	April 13, 2002	Kitt Peak	Spacewatch	·	1.4 km	MPC · JPL
174091	2002 GU_{148}	—	April 14, 2002	Socorro	LINEAR	·	880 m	MPC · JPL
174092	2002 GV_{150}	—	April 14, 2002	Palomar	NEAT	fast	1.2 km	MPC · JPL
174093	2002 GA_{160}	—	April 14, 2002	Haleakala	NEAT	·	1.2 km	MPC · JPL
174094	2002 GU_{181}	—	April 9, 2002	Kitt Peak	Spacewatch	·	880 m	MPC · JPL
174095	2002 HB_{5}	—	April 16, 2002	Socorro	LINEAR	·	1.1 km	MPC · JPL
174096	2002 JJ_{12}	—	May 4, 2002	Desert Eagle	W. K. Y. Yeung	·	1.3 km	MPC · JPL
174097	2002 JJ_{15}	—	May 8, 2002	Socorro	LINEAR	·	930 m	MPC · JPL
174098	2002 JO_{15}	—	May 8, 2002	Socorro	LINEAR	(2076)	1.3 km	MPC · JPL
174099	2002 JT_{19}	—	May 7, 2002	Palomar	NEAT	·	1.5 km	MPC · JPL
174100	2002 JH_{24}	—	May 8, 2002	Socorro	LINEAR	·	1.3 km	MPC · JPL

== 174101–174200 ==
back to top

Designation			Discovery			Properties		Ref
Permanent	Provisional	Named after	Date	Site	Discoverer(s)	Category	Diam.	Ref
174101	2002 JH_{27}	—	May 8, 2002	Socorro	LINEAR	·	1.1 km	MPC · JPL
174102	2002 JS_{37}	—	May 8, 2002	Haleakala	NEAT	·	1.2 km	MPC · JPL
174103	2002 JA_{38}	—	May 8, 2002	Haleakala	NEAT	·	2.2 km	MPC · JPL
174104	2002 JP_{45}	—	May 9, 2002	Socorro	LINEAR	·	1.2 km	MPC · JPL
174105	2002 JJ_{51}	—	May 9, 2002	Socorro	LINEAR	·	1.2 km	MPC · JPL
174106	2002 JS_{53}	—	May 9, 2002	Socorro	LINEAR	·	1.1 km	MPC · JPL
174107	2002 JZ_{53}	—	May 9, 2002	Socorro	LINEAR	·	2.3 km	MPC · JPL
174108	2002 JX_{60}	—	May 10, 2002	Kitt Peak	Spacewatch	V	950 m	MPC · JPL
174109	2002 JG_{62}	—	May 8, 2002	Socorro	LINEAR	·	940 m	MPC · JPL
174110	2002 JE_{65}	—	May 9, 2002	Socorro	LINEAR	MAS	1.3 km	MPC · JPL
174111	2002 JE_{72}	—	May 8, 2002	Socorro	LINEAR	V	1.3 km	MPC · JPL
174112	2002 JS_{82}	—	May 11, 2002	Socorro	LINEAR	·	1.7 km	MPC · JPL
174113	2002 JU_{82}	—	May 11, 2002	Socorro	LINEAR	·	1.9 km	MPC · JPL
174114	2002 JY_{91}	—	May 11, 2002	Socorro	LINEAR	3:2	7.4 km	MPC · JPL
174115	2002 JJ_{93}	—	May 11, 2002	Socorro	LINEAR	·	1.1 km	MPC · JPL
174116	2002 JT_{104}	—	May 11, 2002	Socorro	LINEAR	·	1.2 km	MPC · JPL
174117	2002 JR_{105}	—	May 12, 2002	Socorro	LINEAR	·	1.0 km	MPC · JPL
174118	2002 JA_{127}	—	May 7, 2002	Anderson Mesa	LONEOS	(2076)	1.1 km	MPC · JPL
174119	2002 JA_{135}	—	May 9, 2002	Palomar	NEAT	·	1.7 km	MPC · JPL
174120	2002 JC_{146}	—	May 15, 2002	Socorro	LINEAR	PHO ·	2.2 km	MPC · JPL
174121	2002 KM_{4}	—	May 16, 2002	Socorro	LINEAR	3:2	6.5 km	MPC · JPL
174122	2002 KH_{13}	—	May 18, 2002	Palomar	NEAT	·	880 m	MPC · JPL
174123	2002 LG_{2}	—	June 2, 2002	Palomar	NEAT	EUN	2.5 km	MPC · JPL
174124	2002 LF_{8}	—	June 5, 2002	Socorro	LINEAR	·	1.7 km	MPC · JPL
174125	2002 LA_{12}	—	June 5, 2002	Socorro	LINEAR	·	3.0 km	MPC · JPL
174126	2002 LS_{17}	—	June 6, 2002	Socorro	LINEAR	V	890 m	MPC · JPL
174127	2002 LB_{19}	—	June 6, 2002	Socorro	LINEAR	·	2.5 km	MPC · JPL
174128	2002 LQ_{19}	—	June 6, 2002	Socorro	LINEAR	·	1.5 km	MPC · JPL
174129	2002 LZ_{23}	—	June 8, 2002	Socorro	LINEAR	·	1.5 km	MPC · JPL
174130	2002 LL_{27}	—	June 8, 2002	Socorro	LINEAR	·	1.2 km	MPC · JPL
174131	2002 LT_{43}	—	June 10, 2002	Socorro	LINEAR	·	2.1 km	MPC · JPL
174132	2002 MB_{2}	—	June 16, 2002	Palomar	NEAT	·	2.3 km	MPC · JPL
174133	2002 NX_{10}	—	July 4, 2002	Palomar	NEAT	NYS	1.9 km	MPC · JPL
174134	2002 NE_{11}	—	July 4, 2002	Palomar	NEAT	(5)	2.0 km	MPC · JPL
174135	2002 NT_{12}	—	July 4, 2002	Palomar	NEAT	EUN	1.8 km	MPC · JPL
174136	2002 NR_{15}	—	July 5, 2002	Socorro	LINEAR	V	1.2 km	MPC · JPL
174137	2002 NE_{22}	—	July 9, 2002	Socorro	LINEAR	·	2.4 km	MPC · JPL
174138	2002 NQ_{25}	—	July 9, 2002	Socorro	LINEAR	·	4.9 km	MPC · JPL
174139	2002 NH_{41}	—	July 13, 2002	Haleakala	NEAT	·	3.0 km	MPC · JPL
174140	2002 NK_{50}	—	July 14, 2002	Palomar	NEAT	·	1.9 km	MPC · JPL
174141	2002 NO_{52}	—	July 14, 2002	Palomar	NEAT	·	1.6 km	MPC · JPL
174142	2002 NP_{56}	—	July 9, 2002	Socorro	LINEAR	·	2.5 km	MPC · JPL
174143	2002 NX_{61}	—	July 15, 2002	Palomar	NEAT	·	3.0 km	MPC · JPL
174144	2002 NT_{65}	—	July 14, 2002	Palomar	NEAT	·	850 m	MPC · JPL
174145	2002 OU_{1}	—	July 17, 2002	Socorro	LINEAR	ADE	3.0 km	MPC · JPL
174146	2002 OD_{11}	—	July 22, 2002	Palomar	NEAT	·	2.1 km	MPC · JPL
174147	2002 OP_{11}	—	July 18, 2002	Palomar	NEAT	·	1.6 km	MPC · JPL
174148	2002 OT_{11}	—	July 18, 2002	Socorro	LINEAR	·	2.4 km	MPC · JPL
174149	2002 OH_{22}	—	July 22, 2002	Palomar	NEAT	·	1.8 km	MPC · JPL
174150	2002 PD	—	August 1, 2002	Reedy Creek	J. Broughton	·	1.6 km	MPC · JPL
174151	2002 PQ_{24}	—	August 6, 2002	Palomar	NEAT	V	1.0 km	MPC · JPL
174152	2002 PB_{39}	—	August 6, 2002	Palomar	NEAT	·	1.2 km	MPC · JPL
174153	2002 PO_{46}	—	August 9, 2002	Socorro	LINEAR	·	1.7 km	MPC · JPL
174154	2002 PP_{46}	—	August 9, 2002	Socorro	LINEAR	·	1.7 km	MPC · JPL
174155	2002 PH_{47}	—	August 10, 2002	Socorro	LINEAR	·	2.4 km	MPC · JPL
174156	2002 PX_{47}	—	August 10, 2002	Socorro	LINEAR	ADE	4.1 km	MPC · JPL
174157	2002 PR_{61}	—	August 11, 2002	Socorro	LINEAR	·	2.4 km	MPC · JPL
174158	2002 PM_{62}	—	August 8, 2002	Palomar	NEAT	·	1.1 km	MPC · JPL
174159	2002 PO_{64}	—	August 3, 2002	Palomar	NEAT	GEF	2.1 km	MPC · JPL
174160	2002 PA_{66}	—	August 6, 2002	Palomar	NEAT	·	2.0 km	MPC · JPL
174161	2002 PU_{66}	—	August 6, 2002	Palomar	NEAT	·	1.9 km	MPC · JPL
174162	2002 PE_{67}	—	August 6, 2002	Palomar	NEAT	·	1.6 km	MPC · JPL
174163	2002 PK_{69}	—	August 11, 2002	Socorro	LINEAR	ADE	4.3 km	MPC · JPL
174164	2002 PD_{71}	—	August 11, 2002	Socorro	LINEAR	·	3.0 km	MPC · JPL
174165	2002 PH_{73}	—	August 12, 2002	Socorro	LINEAR	·	2.4 km	MPC · JPL
174166	2002 PO_{77}	—	August 11, 2002	Haleakala	NEAT	·	4.5 km	MPC · JPL
174167	2002 PC_{81}	—	August 13, 2002	Palomar	NEAT	NYS	970 m	MPC · JPL
174168	2002 PD_{84}	—	August 10, 2002	Socorro	LINEAR	·	1.4 km	MPC · JPL
174169	2002 PP_{88}	—	August 13, 2002	Kitt Peak	Spacewatch	(5)	1.5 km	MPC · JPL
174170	2002 PE_{90}	—	August 11, 2002	Socorro	LINEAR	MAR	2.8 km	MPC · JPL
174171	2002 PX_{90}	—	August 13, 2002	Socorro	LINEAR	ADE	4.8 km	MPC · JPL
174172	2002 PA_{91}	—	August 13, 2002	Socorro	LINEAR	·	3.3 km	MPC · JPL
174173	2002 PL_{97}	—	August 14, 2002	Socorro	LINEAR	·	2.3 km	MPC · JPL
174174	2002 PO_{97}	—	August 14, 2002	Socorro	LINEAR	·	2.4 km	MPC · JPL
174175	2002 PY_{97}	—	August 14, 2002	Socorro	LINEAR	EUN	2.3 km	MPC · JPL
174176	2002 PU_{109}	—	August 13, 2002	Anderson Mesa	LONEOS	(1547)	1.9 km	MPC · JPL
174177	2002 PH_{116}	—	August 14, 2002	Palomar	NEAT	·	3.9 km	MPC · JPL
174178	2002 PK_{120}	—	August 13, 2002	Anderson Mesa	LONEOS	·	2.5 km	MPC · JPL
174179	2002 PB_{126}	—	August 14, 2002	Socorro	LINEAR	·	2.3 km	MPC · JPL
174180	2002 PL_{130}	—	August 13, 2002	Socorro	LINEAR	·	2.0 km	MPC · JPL
174181	2002 PR_{133}	—	August 14, 2002	Socorro	LINEAR	·	1.7 km	MPC · JPL
174182	2002 PJ_{136}	—	August 14, 2002	Socorro	LINEAR	·	3.8 km	MPC · JPL
174183	2002 PA_{138}	—	August 15, 2002	Kitt Peak	Spacewatch	·	2.1 km	MPC · JPL
174184	2002 PB_{142}	—	August 15, 2002	Palomar	NEAT	·	2.9 km	MPC · JPL
174185	2002 PP_{155}	—	August 8, 2002	Palomar	S. F. Hönig	·	1.9 km	MPC · JPL
174186	2002 PY_{157}	—	August 8, 2002	Palomar	S. F. Hönig	·	1.2 km	MPC · JPL
174187	2002 PP_{164}	—	August 9, 2002	Haleakala	Lowe, A.	·	2.4 km	MPC · JPL
174188	2002 QM_{1}	—	August 16, 2002	Haleakala	NEAT	·	1.4 km	MPC · JPL
174189	2002 QL_{3}	—	August 16, 2002	Palomar	NEAT	·	1.9 km	MPC · JPL
174190	2002 QK_{4}	—	August 16, 2002	Haleakala	NEAT	EUN	1.9 km	MPC · JPL
174191	2002 QL_{9}	—	August 19, 2002	Palomar	NEAT	·	2.0 km	MPC · JPL
174192	2002 QM_{12}	—	August 26, 2002	Palomar	NEAT	·	2.0 km	MPC · JPL
174193	2002 QQ_{17}	—	August 27, 2002	Palomar	NEAT	·	1.9 km	MPC · JPL
174194	2002 QW_{19}	—	August 28, 2002	Palomar	NEAT	·	3.9 km	MPC · JPL
174195	2002 QW_{30}	—	August 29, 2002	Palomar	NEAT	·	1.8 km	MPC · JPL
174196	2002 QX_{30}	—	August 29, 2002	Palomar	NEAT	·	2.4 km	MPC · JPL
174197	2002 QN_{36}	—	August 28, 2002	Palomar	NEAT	KOR	2.2 km	MPC · JPL
174198	2002 QS_{41}	—	August 29, 2002	Palomar	NEAT	·	2.1 km	MPC · JPL
174199	2002 QS_{43}	—	August 30, 2002	Palomar	NEAT	·	2.3 km	MPC · JPL
174200	2002 QF_{46}	—	August 31, 2002	Socorro	LINEAR	·	2.4 km	MPC · JPL

== 174201–174300 ==
back to top

Designation			Discovery			Properties		Ref
Permanent	Provisional	Named after	Date	Site	Discoverer(s)	Category	Diam.	Ref
174201	2002 QO_{48}	—	August 18, 2002	Palomar	S. F. Hönig	·	1.7 km	MPC · JPL
174202	2002 QQ_{49}	—	August 18, 2002	Palomar	S. F. Hönig	·	1.5 km	MPC · JPL
174203	2002 QY_{50}	—	August 28, 2002	Palomar	R. Matson	·	2.3 km	MPC · JPL
174204	2002 QM_{63}	—	August 18, 2002	Palomar	NEAT	·	1.7 km	MPC · JPL
174205	2002 QW_{63}	—	August 18, 2002	Palomar	NEAT	·	4.0 km	MPC · JPL
174206	2002 QB_{68}	—	August 27, 2002	Palomar	NEAT	·	1.2 km	MPC · JPL
174207	2002 QF_{69}	—	August 28, 2002	Palomar	NEAT	NYS	1.4 km	MPC · JPL
174208	2002 QF_{76}	—	August 20, 2002	Palomar	NEAT	·	1.8 km	MPC · JPL
174209	2002 QX_{79}	—	August 28, 2002	Palomar	NEAT	·	2.0 km	MPC · JPL
174210	2002 QH_{81}	—	August 16, 2002	Palomar	NEAT	·	1.6 km	MPC · JPL
174211	2002 QH_{92}	—	August 18, 2002	Palomar	NEAT	·	1.8 km	MPC · JPL
174212	2002 QD_{95}	—	August 18, 2002	Palomar	NEAT	·	1.7 km	MPC · JPL
174213	2002 QO_{104}	—	August 17, 2002	Palomar	NEAT	·	1.6 km	MPC · JPL
174214	2002 QC_{105}	—	August 27, 2002	Palomar	NEAT	MAS	1.1 km	MPC · JPL
174215	2002 QE_{117}	—	August 16, 2002	Palomar	NEAT	·	2.1 km	MPC · JPL
174216	2002 QO_{122}	—	August 29, 2002	Palomar	NEAT	·	1.9 km	MPC · JPL
174217	2002 RE_{2}	—	September 4, 2002	Anderson Mesa	LONEOS	MAR	2.0 km	MPC · JPL
174218	2002 RK_{2}	—	September 4, 2002	Anderson Mesa	LONEOS	·	1.9 km	MPC · JPL
174219	2002 RB_{12}	—	September 4, 2002	Anderson Mesa	LONEOS	·	2.0 km	MPC · JPL
174220	2002 RW_{16}	—	September 4, 2002	Anderson Mesa	LONEOS	·	2.1 km	MPC · JPL
174221	2002 RK_{19}	—	September 4, 2002	Anderson Mesa	LONEOS	·	1.7 km	MPC · JPL
174222	2002 RE_{24}	—	September 4, 2002	Anderson Mesa	LONEOS	·	2.7 km	MPC · JPL
174223	2002 RZ_{29}	—	September 4, 2002	Anderson Mesa	LONEOS	·	1.8 km	MPC · JPL
174224	2002 RK_{30}	—	September 4, 2002	Anderson Mesa	LONEOS	(5)	2.0 km	MPC · JPL
174225	2002 RO_{33}	—	September 4, 2002	Anderson Mesa	LONEOS	HOF	5.7 km	MPC · JPL
174226	2002 RQ_{33}	—	September 4, 2002	Anderson Mesa	LONEOS	·	2.8 km	MPC · JPL
174227	2002 RX_{42}	—	September 5, 2002	Socorro	LINEAR	(5)	1.5 km	MPC · JPL
174228	2002 RN_{45}	—	September 5, 2002	Anderson Mesa	LONEOS	·	1.7 km	MPC · JPL
174229	2002 RX_{49}	—	September 5, 2002	Socorro	LINEAR	·	4.5 km	MPC · JPL
174230	2002 RY_{66}	—	September 3, 2002	Palomar	NEAT	·	2.5 km	MPC · JPL
174231	2002 RL_{72}	—	September 5, 2002	Socorro	LINEAR	·	2.1 km	MPC · JPL
174232	2002 RH_{73}	—	September 5, 2002	Socorro	LINEAR	·	1.5 km	MPC · JPL
174233	2002 RH_{82}	—	September 5, 2002	Socorro	LINEAR	·	6.8 km	MPC · JPL
174234	2002 RD_{84}	—	September 5, 2002	Socorro	LINEAR	MRX	1.8 km	MPC · JPL
174235	2002 RA_{92}	—	September 5, 2002	Socorro	LINEAR	(5)	1.8 km	MPC · JPL
174236	2002 RO_{117}	—	September 8, 2002	Campo Imperatore	CINEOS	·	2.3 km	MPC · JPL
174237	2002 RQ_{122}	—	September 8, 2002	Haleakala	NEAT	·	3.1 km	MPC · JPL
174238	2002 RV_{122}	—	September 8, 2002	Haleakala	NEAT	GEF	1.8 km	MPC · JPL
174239	2002 RQ_{124}	—	September 9, 2002	Palomar	NEAT	·	2.4 km	MPC · JPL
174240	2002 RR_{130}	—	September 10, 2002	Kvistaberg	Uppsala-DLR Asteroid Survey	EUN	1.7 km	MPC · JPL
174241	2002 RE_{145}	—	September 11, 2002	Palomar	NEAT	·	2.8 km	MPC · JPL
174242	2002 RC_{148}	—	September 11, 2002	Palomar	NEAT	·	1.5 km	MPC · JPL
174243	2002 RC_{149}	—	September 11, 2002	Palomar	NEAT	·	3.2 km	MPC · JPL
174244	2002 RM_{154}	—	September 10, 2002	Haleakala	NEAT	·	940 m	MPC · JPL
174245	2002 RK_{155}	—	September 11, 2002	Palomar	NEAT	·	2.9 km	MPC · JPL
174246	2002 RN_{158}	—	September 11, 2002	Palomar	NEAT	(2076)	1.7 km	MPC · JPL
174247	2002 RG_{170}	—	September 13, 2002	Palomar	NEAT	(5)	1.8 km	MPC · JPL
174248	2002 RL_{172}	—	September 13, 2002	Anderson Mesa	LONEOS	ADE	3.8 km	MPC · JPL
174249	2002 RU_{174}	—	September 13, 2002	Palomar	NEAT	·	1.7 km	MPC · JPL
174250	2002 RU_{177}	—	September 13, 2002	Palomar	NEAT	·	1.5 km	MPC · JPL
174251	2002 RR_{184}	—	September 12, 2002	Palomar	NEAT	·	2.9 km	MPC · JPL
174252	2002 RN_{186}	—	September 12, 2002	Palomar	NEAT	·	2.9 km	MPC · JPL
174253	2002 RN_{189}	—	September 14, 2002	Palomar	NEAT	·	1.8 km	MPC · JPL
174254	2002 RK_{199}	—	September 13, 2002	Palomar	NEAT	ADE	2.8 km	MPC · JPL
174255	2002 RP_{200}	—	September 13, 2002	Socorro	LINEAR	·	1.9 km	MPC · JPL
174256	2002 RS_{200}	—	September 13, 2002	Socorro	LINEAR	·	1.7 km	MPC · JPL
174257	2002 RM_{211}	—	September 14, 2002	Haleakala	NEAT	·	1.5 km	MPC · JPL
174258	2002 RE_{216}	—	September 13, 2002	Anderson Mesa	LONEOS	·	2.7 km	MPC · JPL
174259	2002 RF_{219}	—	September 15, 2002	Palomar	NEAT	V	1.1 km	MPC · JPL
174260	2002 RR_{224}	—	September 13, 2002	Anderson Mesa	LONEOS	·	2.7 km	MPC · JPL
174261	2002 RB_{227}	—	September 14, 2002	Palomar	NEAT	·	1.5 km	MPC · JPL
174262	2002 RC_{231}	—	September 15, 2002	Haleakala	NEAT	·	2.8 km	MPC · JPL
174263	2002 RJ_{238}	—	September 14, 2002	Palomar	R. Matson	NYS	1.4 km	MPC · JPL
174264	2002 RB_{239}	—	September 14, 2002	Palomar	R. Matson	·	2.6 km	MPC · JPL
174265	2002 RM_{239}	—	September 14, 2002	Palomar	R. Matson	V	1.1 km	MPC · JPL
174266	2002 RW_{239}	—	September 4, 2002	Palomar	S. F. Hönig	(2076)	1.2 km	MPC · JPL
174267	2002 RS_{254}	—	September 14, 2002	Palomar	NEAT	(5)	1.6 km	MPC · JPL
174268	2002 RF_{263}	—	September 15, 2002	Anderson Mesa	LONEOS	·	5.4 km	MPC · JPL
174269	2002 RL_{274}	—	September 1, 2002	Palomar	NEAT	·	1.6 km	MPC · JPL
174270	2002 SU_{8}	—	September 27, 2002	Palomar	NEAT	·	2.4 km	MPC · JPL
174271	2002 SV_{8}	—	September 27, 2002	Palomar	NEAT	·	2.6 km	MPC · JPL
174272	2002 SK_{10}	—	September 27, 2002	Palomar	NEAT	MAR	1.6 km	MPC · JPL
174273	2002 SL_{10}	—	September 27, 2002	Palomar	NEAT	·	3.1 km	MPC · JPL
174274	2002 SH_{11}	—	September 27, 2002	Palomar	NEAT	·	1.7 km	MPC · JPL
174275	2002 SX_{15}	—	September 27, 2002	Palomar	NEAT	·	1.7 km	MPC · JPL
174276	2002 SX_{16}	—	September 27, 2002	Palomar	NEAT	·	1.9 km	MPC · JPL
174277	2002 SH_{17}	—	September 26, 2002	Palomar	NEAT	NYS	1.7 km	MPC · JPL
174278	2002 SB_{22}	—	September 26, 2002	Palomar	NEAT	·	2.9 km	MPC · JPL
174279	2002 SE_{27}	—	September 29, 2002	Haleakala	NEAT	(5)	1.9 km	MPC · JPL
174280	2002 SL_{27}	—	September 29, 2002	Haleakala	NEAT	·	2.6 km	MPC · JPL
174281 Lonský	2002 SC_{29}	Lonský	September 30, 2002	Ondřejov	P. Pravec	·	2.5 km	MPC · JPL
174282	2002 SA_{32}	—	September 28, 2002	Haleakala	NEAT	·	2.8 km	MPC · JPL
174283	2002 SS_{32}	—	September 28, 2002	Haleakala	NEAT	·	1.8 km	MPC · JPL
174284	2002 SK_{33}	—	September 28, 2002	Haleakala	NEAT	·	1.9 km	MPC · JPL
174285	2002 SL_{35}	—	September 29, 2002	Haleakala	NEAT	MIS	3.9 km	MPC · JPL
174286	2002 SO_{36}	—	September 29, 2002	Haleakala	NEAT	·	2.5 km	MPC · JPL
174287	2002 SX_{37}	—	September 29, 2002	Haleakala	NEAT	·	2.5 km	MPC · JPL
174288	2002 SL_{38}	—	September 30, 2002	Socorro	LINEAR	·	2.4 km	MPC · JPL
174289	2002 SV_{46}	—	September 29, 2002	Haleakala	NEAT	·	3.4 km	MPC · JPL
174290	2002 SX_{46}	—	September 29, 2002	Haleakala	NEAT	EUN	2.5 km	MPC · JPL
174291	2002 SA_{48}	—	September 30, 2002	Socorro	LINEAR	·	2.8 km	MPC · JPL
174292	2002 SG_{50}	—	September 30, 2002	Haleakala	NEAT	·	3.3 km	MPC · JPL
174293	2002 SW_{52}	—	September 18, 2002	Palomar	NEAT	·	2.9 km	MPC · JPL
174294	2002 SP_{56}	—	September 30, 2002	Haleakala	NEAT	·	1.7 km	MPC · JPL
174295	2002 SG_{57}	—	September 30, 2002	Haleakala	NEAT	·	2.7 km	MPC · JPL
174296	2002 TA_{4}	—	October 1, 2002	Anderson Mesa	LONEOS	·	2.0 km	MPC · JPL
174297	2002 TV_{12}	—	October 1, 2002	Anderson Mesa	LONEOS	·	4.5 km	MPC · JPL
174298	2002 TK_{15}	—	October 2, 2002	Socorro	LINEAR	(5)	1.6 km	MPC · JPL
174299	2002 TQ_{19}	—	October 2, 2002	Socorro	LINEAR	·	2.1 km	MPC · JPL
174300	2002 TR_{21}	—	October 2, 2002	Socorro	LINEAR	·	2.5 km	MPC · JPL

== 174301–174400 ==
back to top

Designation			Discovery			Properties		Ref
Permanent	Provisional	Named after	Date	Site	Discoverer(s)	Category	Diam.	Ref
174301	2002 TJ_{24}	—	October 2, 2002	Socorro	LINEAR	·	2.5 km	MPC · JPL
174302	2002 TZ_{27}	—	October 2, 2002	Socorro	LINEAR	MRX	1.5 km	MPC · JPL
174303	2002 TZ_{42}	—	October 2, 2002	Socorro	LINEAR	·	3.7 km	MPC · JPL
174304	2002 TE_{45}	—	October 2, 2002	Socorro	LINEAR	·	2.5 km	MPC · JPL
174305	2002 TQ_{56}	—	October 2, 2002	Socorro	LINEAR	·	1.6 km	MPC · JPL
174306	2002 TU_{61}	—	October 3, 2002	Campo Imperatore	CINEOS	·	2.4 km	MPC · JPL
174307	2002 TY_{61}	—	October 3, 2002	Campo Imperatore	CINEOS	·	2.4 km	MPC · JPL
174308	2002 TS_{63}	—	October 4, 2002	Campo Imperatore	CINEOS	·	1.6 km	MPC · JPL
174309	2002 TX_{65}	—	October 4, 2002	Campo Imperatore	CINEOS	·	1.7 km	MPC · JPL
174310	2002 TL_{70}	—	October 3, 2002	Palomar	NEAT	·	3.0 km	MPC · JPL
174311	2002 TS_{72}	—	October 3, 2002	Palomar	NEAT	·	3.1 km	MPC · JPL
174312	2002 TF_{73}	—	October 3, 2002	Palomar	NEAT	·	3.5 km	MPC · JPL
174313	2002 TM_{75}	—	October 1, 2002	Anderson Mesa	LONEOS	·	2.4 km	MPC · JPL
174314	2002 TF_{77}	—	October 1, 2002	Anderson Mesa	LONEOS	·	3.8 km	MPC · JPL
174315	2002 TA_{86}	—	October 2, 2002	Campo Imperatore	CINEOS	LEO	3.0 km	MPC · JPL
174316	2002 TS_{87}	—	October 3, 2002	Socorro	LINEAR	·	1.8 km	MPC · JPL
174317	2002 TM_{91}	—	October 3, 2002	Palomar	NEAT	DOR	6.2 km	MPC · JPL
174318	2002 TK_{94}	—	October 3, 2002	Socorro	LINEAR	·	2.8 km	MPC · JPL
174319	2002 TJ_{97}	—	October 2, 2002	Socorro	LINEAR	·	1.2 km	MPC · JPL
174320	2002 TT_{109}	—	October 2, 2002	Haleakala	NEAT	·	3.0 km	MPC · JPL
174321	2002 TP_{110}	—	October 2, 2002	Haleakala	NEAT	EUN	2.3 km	MPC · JPL
174322	2002 TG_{115}	—	October 3, 2002	Palomar	NEAT	·	2.2 km	MPC · JPL
174323	2002 TV_{118}	—	October 3, 2002	Palomar	NEAT	·	3.4 km	MPC · JPL
174324	2002 TN_{120}	—	October 3, 2002	Palomar	NEAT	·	2.7 km	MPC · JPL
174325	2002 TS_{121}	—	October 3, 2002	Palomar	NEAT	·	2.5 km	MPC · JPL
174326	2002 TD_{122}	—	October 3, 2002	Campo Imperatore	CINEOS	·	2.5 km	MPC · JPL
174327	2002 TO_{122}	—	October 4, 2002	Palomar	NEAT	NAE	5.2 km	MPC · JPL
174328	2002 TC_{132}	—	October 4, 2002	Socorro	LINEAR	·	2.3 km	MPC · JPL
174329	2002 TV_{136}	—	October 4, 2002	Anderson Mesa	LONEOS	·	4.3 km	MPC · JPL
174330	2002 TW_{136}	—	October 4, 2002	Anderson Mesa	LONEOS	·	1.6 km	MPC · JPL
174331	2002 TR_{138}	—	October 4, 2002	Anderson Mesa	LONEOS	·	3.4 km	MPC · JPL
174332	2002 TD_{140}	—	October 3, 2002	Socorro	LINEAR	·	1.7 km	MPC · JPL
174333	2002 TN_{143}	—	October 4, 2002	Socorro	LINEAR	RAF	1.4 km	MPC · JPL
174334	2002 TH_{160}	—	October 5, 2002	Palomar	NEAT	·	3.8 km	MPC · JPL
174335	2002 TK_{171}	—	October 3, 2002	Palomar	NEAT	EUN	2.0 km	MPC · JPL
174336	2002 TS_{171}	—	October 4, 2002	Palomar	NEAT	·	3.3 km	MPC · JPL
174337	2002 TC_{177}	—	October 5, 2002	Palomar	NEAT	·	3.9 km	MPC · JPL
174338	2002 TO_{180}	—	October 14, 2002	Socorro	LINEAR	·	3.1 km	MPC · JPL
174339	2002 TE_{191}	—	October 1, 2002	Socorro	LINEAR	ADE	3.4 km	MPC · JPL
174340	2002 TP_{193}	—	October 3, 2002	Socorro	LINEAR	·	2.8 km	MPC · JPL
174341	2002 TA_{204}	—	October 4, 2002	Socorro	LINEAR	·	3.4 km	MPC · JPL
174342	2002 TY_{209}	—	October 6, 2002	Haleakala	NEAT	·	2.3 km	MPC · JPL
174343	2002 TX_{211}	—	October 6, 2002	Haleakala	NEAT	·	3.1 km	MPC · JPL
174344	2002 TS_{216}	—	October 6, 2002	Haleakala	NEAT	·	2.1 km	MPC · JPL
174345	2002 TA_{225}	—	October 8, 2002	Anderson Mesa	LONEOS	·	2.7 km	MPC · JPL
174346	2002 TY_{231}	—	October 6, 2002	Socorro	LINEAR	EUN	2.3 km	MPC · JPL
174347	2002 TJ_{232}	—	October 6, 2002	Socorro	LINEAR	·	2.1 km	MPC · JPL
174348	2002 TQ_{241}	—	October 7, 2002	Haleakala	NEAT	EUN	2.0 km	MPC · JPL
174349	2002 TB_{242}	—	October 9, 2002	Anderson Mesa	LONEOS	·	2.3 km	MPC · JPL
174350	2002 TC_{243}	—	October 9, 2002	Anderson Mesa	LONEOS	·	3.1 km	MPC · JPL
174351	2002 TP_{249}	—	October 7, 2002	Socorro	LINEAR	·	2.7 km	MPC · JPL
174352	2002 TU_{255}	—	October 9, 2002	Socorro	LINEAR	(29841)	2.6 km	MPC · JPL
174353	2002 TT_{257}	—	October 9, 2002	Socorro	LINEAR	·	6.0 km	MPC · JPL
174354	2002 TL_{261}	—	October 9, 2002	Socorro	LINEAR	·	6.3 km	MPC · JPL
174355	2002 TS_{276}	—	October 9, 2002	Socorro	LINEAR	·	1.7 km	MPC · JPL
174356	2002 TS_{279}	—	October 10, 2002	Socorro	LINEAR	MAR	2.9 km	MPC · JPL
174357	2002 TA_{282}	—	October 10, 2002	Socorro	LINEAR	·	4.0 km	MPC · JPL
174358	2002 TU_{287}	—	October 10, 2002	Socorro	LINEAR	·	3.2 km	MPC · JPL
174359	2002 TO_{292}	—	October 10, 2002	Socorro	LINEAR	BRA	2.3 km	MPC · JPL
174360	2002 TX_{295}	—	October 13, 2002	Palomar	NEAT	·	3.2 km	MPC · JPL
174361 Rickwhite	2002 TV_{315}	Rickwhite	October 4, 2002	Apache Point	SDSS	·	2.2 km	MPC · JPL
174362 Bethwillman	2002 TE_{324}	Bethwillman	October 5, 2002	Apache Point	SDSS	ADE	4.3 km	MPC · JPL
174363 Donyork	2002 TW_{343}	Donyork	October 5, 2002	Apache Point	SDSS	GEF	1.7 km	MPC · JPL
174364 Zakamska	2002 TH_{369}	Zakamska	October 10, 2002	Apache Point	SDSS	·	4.8 km	MPC · JPL
174365 Zibetti	2002 TF_{371}	Zibetti	October 10, 2002	Apache Point	SDSS	·	2.4 km	MPC · JPL
174366	2002 TD_{376}	—	October 12, 2002	Socorro	LINEAR	·	3.1 km	MPC · JPL
174367	2002 UK_{3}	—	October 28, 2002	Palomar	NEAT	·	1.9 km	MPC · JPL
174368	2002 UR_{9}	—	October 29, 2002	Mount Hopkins	T. B. Spahr	EUP	7.7 km	MPC · JPL
174369	2002 UD_{11}	—	October 29, 2002	Kvistaberg	Uppsala-DLR Asteroid Survey	·	2.2 km	MPC · JPL
174370	2002 UA_{17}	—	October 30, 2002	Haleakala	NEAT	·	2.5 km	MPC · JPL
174371	2002 UZ_{31}	—	October 30, 2002	Haleakala	NEAT	EUN	1.6 km	MPC · JPL
174372	2002 UV_{34}	—	October 31, 2002	Anderson Mesa	LONEOS	·	1.9 km	MPC · JPL
174373	2002 UW_{36}	—	October 31, 2002	Kvistaberg	Uppsala-DLR Asteroid Survey	·	2.3 km	MPC · JPL
174374	2002 UU_{37}	—	October 31, 2002	Palomar	NEAT	(5)	2.0 km	MPC · JPL
174375	2002 UC_{42}	—	October 30, 2002	Kitt Peak	Spacewatch	·	2.8 km	MPC · JPL
174376	2002 UU_{44}	—	October 30, 2002	Socorro	LINEAR	RAF	1.4 km	MPC · JPL
174377	2002 UO_{45}	—	October 31, 2002	Anderson Mesa	LONEOS	AGN	1.7 km	MPC · JPL
174378	2002 UJ_{49}	—	October 31, 2002	Socorro	LINEAR	ADE	2.7 km	MPC · JPL
174379	2002 UT_{49}	—	October 31, 2002	Socorro	LINEAR	·	3.2 km	MPC · JPL
174380	2002 VX_{6}	—	November 1, 2002	Palomar	NEAT	HOF	4.7 km	MPC · JPL
174381	2002 VE_{7}	—	November 4, 2002	Palomar	NEAT	·	2.2 km	MPC · JPL
174382	2002 VE_{8}	—	November 1, 2002	Palomar	NEAT	·	2.5 km	MPC · JPL
174383	2002 VG_{8}	—	November 1, 2002	Palomar	NEAT	·	2.0 km	MPC · JPL
174384	2002 VP_{8}	—	November 1, 2002	Palomar	NEAT	MAR	1.6 km	MPC · JPL
174385	2002 VR_{10}	—	November 1, 2002	Palomar	NEAT	·	2.3 km	MPC · JPL
174386	2002 VP_{11}	—	November 1, 2002	Palomar	NEAT	·	2.0 km	MPC · JPL
174387	2002 VP_{12}	—	November 4, 2002	Anderson Mesa	LONEOS	·	2.6 km	MPC · JPL
174388	2002 VV_{12}	—	November 4, 2002	Palomar	NEAT	·	2.3 km	MPC · JPL
174389	2002 VF_{18}	—	November 2, 2002	Haleakala	NEAT	·	1.8 km	MPC · JPL
174390	2002 VX_{19}	—	November 4, 2002	Kitt Peak	Spacewatch	·	2.3 km	MPC · JPL
174391	2002 VG_{22}	—	November 5, 2002	Socorro	LINEAR	·	3.2 km	MPC · JPL
174392	2002 VE_{26}	—	November 5, 2002	Socorro	LINEAR	·	2.4 km	MPC · JPL
174393	2002 VO_{31}	—	November 5, 2002	Socorro	LINEAR	·	2.7 km	MPC · JPL
174394	2002 VU_{33}	—	November 5, 2002	Socorro	LINEAR	·	3.5 km	MPC · JPL
174395	2002 VU_{39}	—	November 5, 2002	Socorro	LINEAR	·	2.6 km	MPC · JPL
174396	2002 VU_{40}	—	November 1, 2002	Palomar	NEAT	·	2.5 km	MPC · JPL
174397	2002 VX_{44}	—	November 5, 2002	Anderson Mesa	LONEOS	ADE	4.1 km	MPC · JPL
174398	2002 VO_{52}	—	November 6, 2002	Anderson Mesa	LONEOS	·	2.0 km	MPC · JPL
174399	2002 VU_{54}	—	November 6, 2002	Socorro	LINEAR	·	3.1 km	MPC · JPL
174400	2002 VX_{58}	—	November 6, 2002	Haleakala	NEAT	·	2.9 km	MPC · JPL

== 174401–174500 ==
back to top

Designation			Discovery			Properties		Ref
Permanent	Provisional	Named after	Date	Site	Discoverer(s)	Category	Diam.	Ref
174401	2002 VJ_{62}	—	November 5, 2002	Socorro	LINEAR	·	3.0 km	MPC · JPL
174402	2002 VU_{71}	—	November 7, 2002	Socorro	LINEAR	·	2.3 km	MPC · JPL
174403	2002 VF_{72}	—	November 7, 2002	Socorro	LINEAR	·	2.1 km	MPC · JPL
174404	2002 VM_{72}	—	November 7, 2002	Socorro	LINEAR	·	3.1 km	MPC · JPL
174405	2002 VV_{73}	—	November 7, 2002	Socorro	LINEAR	·	2.3 km	MPC · JPL
174406	2002 VL_{75}	—	November 7, 2002	Socorro	LINEAR	·	3.6 km	MPC · JPL
174407	2002 VW_{75}	—	November 7, 2002	Socorro	LINEAR	·	2.4 km	MPC · JPL
174408	2002 VG_{76}	—	November 7, 2002	Socorro	LINEAR	NEM	3.0 km	MPC · JPL
174409	2002 VM_{79}	—	November 7, 2002	Socorro	LINEAR	·	3.0 km	MPC · JPL
174410	2002 VT_{80}	—	November 7, 2002	Socorro	LINEAR	·	2.2 km	MPC · JPL
174411	2002 VP_{86}	—	November 8, 2002	Socorro	LINEAR	·	1.8 km	MPC · JPL
174412	2002 VU_{101}	—	November 11, 2002	Socorro	LINEAR	·	3.4 km	MPC · JPL
174413	2002 VC_{107}	—	November 12, 2002	Socorro	LINEAR	·	4.5 km	MPC · JPL
174414	2002 VL_{111}	—	November 13, 2002	Socorro	LINEAR	·	3.1 km	MPC · JPL
174415	2002 VS_{111}	—	November 13, 2002	Palomar	NEAT	·	3.0 km	MPC · JPL
174416	2002 VQ_{112}	—	November 13, 2002	Palomar	NEAT	·	2.9 km	MPC · JPL
174417	2002 VF_{114}	—	November 13, 2002	Palomar	NEAT	·	3.7 km	MPC · JPL
174418	2002 VZ_{121}	—	November 13, 2002	Palomar	NEAT	GEF	2.2 km	MPC · JPL
174419	2002 VS_{129}	—	November 6, 2002	Haleakala	NEAT	·	2.0 km	MPC · JPL
174420	2002 VU_{139}	—	November 14, 2002	Socorro	LINEAR	·	3.7 km	MPC · JPL
174421	2002 WS_{1}	—	November 23, 2002	Palomar	NEAT	·	2.4 km	MPC · JPL
174422	2002 WW_{1}	—	November 23, 2002	Palomar	NEAT	·	3.0 km	MPC · JPL
174423	2002 WS_{7}	—	November 24, 2002	Palomar	NEAT	NEM	3.3 km	MPC · JPL
174424	2002 WY_{13}	—	November 28, 2002	Anderson Mesa	LONEOS	·	3.0 km	MPC · JPL
174425	2002 WF_{15}	—	November 28, 2002	Anderson Mesa	LONEOS	·	2.2 km	MPC · JPL
174426	2002 WO_{18}	—	November 30, 2002	Socorro	LINEAR	·	3.1 km	MPC · JPL
174427	2002 WL_{19}	—	November 25, 2002	Palomar	S. F. Hönig	KOR	1.8 km	MPC · JPL
174428	2002 XS	—	December 1, 2002	Socorro	LINEAR	·	3.3 km	MPC · JPL
174429	2002 XZ_{7}	—	December 2, 2002	Socorro	LINEAR	·	3.0 km	MPC · JPL
174430	2002 XO_{11}	—	December 3, 2002	Palomar	NEAT	·	2.7 km	MPC · JPL
174431	2002 XA_{12}	—	December 3, 2002	Palomar	NEAT	·	6.5 km	MPC · JPL
174432	2002 XG_{13}	—	December 3, 2002	Haleakala	NEAT	·	4.5 km	MPC · JPL
174433	2002 XN_{16}	—	December 3, 2002	Palomar	NEAT	·	4.5 km	MPC · JPL
174434	2002 XK_{22}	—	December 3, 2002	Palomar	NEAT	·	3.2 km	MPC · JPL
174435	2002 XU_{27}	—	December 5, 2002	Socorro	LINEAR	·	2.5 km	MPC · JPL
174436	2002 XJ_{30}	—	December 6, 2002	Socorro	LINEAR	EUN	2.4 km	MPC · JPL
174437	2002 XK_{30}	—	December 6, 2002	Socorro	LINEAR	·	3.7 km	MPC · JPL
174438	2002 XW_{30}	—	December 6, 2002	Socorro	LINEAR	·	5.9 km	MPC · JPL
174439	2002 XF_{39}	—	December 7, 2002	Desert Eagle	W. K. Y. Yeung	·	2.6 km	MPC · JPL
174440	2002 XQ_{39}	—	December 9, 2002	Desert Eagle	W. K. Y. Yeung	·	7.7 km	MPC · JPL
174441	2002 XV_{40}	—	December 7, 2002	Socorro	LINEAR	(14916)	4.9 km	MPC · JPL
174442	2002 XE_{43}	—	December 9, 2002	Desert Eagle	W. K. Y. Yeung	DOR	4.3 km	MPC · JPL
174443	2002 XP_{43}	—	December 6, 2002	Socorro	LINEAR	(5)	1.7 km	MPC · JPL
174444	2002 XH_{59}	—	December 12, 2002	Palomar	NEAT	(194)	3.2 km	MPC · JPL
174445	2002 XA_{60}	—	December 10, 2002	Socorro	LINEAR	H	830 m	MPC · JPL
174446	2002 XS_{64}	—	December 11, 2002	Socorro	LINEAR	·	3.0 km	MPC · JPL
174447	2002 XO_{67}	—	December 10, 2002	Socorro	LINEAR	·	3.3 km	MPC · JPL
174448	2002 XN_{68}	—	December 12, 2002	Haleakala	NEAT	·	4.8 km	MPC · JPL
174449	2002 XC_{75}	—	December 11, 2002	Socorro	LINEAR	·	3.3 km	MPC · JPL
174450	2002 XO_{75}	—	December 11, 2002	Socorro	LINEAR	·	3.3 km	MPC · JPL
174451	2002 XH_{77}	—	December 11, 2002	Socorro	LINEAR	·	4.1 km	MPC · JPL
174452	2002 XJ_{77}	—	December 11, 2002	Socorro	LINEAR	·	5.6 km	MPC · JPL
174453	2002 XQ_{79}	—	December 11, 2002	Socorro	LINEAR	·	4.0 km	MPC · JPL
174454	2002 XJ_{82}	—	December 11, 2002	Socorro	LINEAR	·	4.6 km	MPC · JPL
174455	2002 XC_{84}	—	December 13, 2002	Anderson Mesa	LONEOS	·	3.1 km	MPC · JPL
174456	2002 XT_{87}	—	December 12, 2002	Palomar	NEAT	·	5.7 km	MPC · JPL
174457	2002 XG_{108}	—	December 6, 2002	Socorro	LINEAR	·	2.8 km	MPC · JPL
174458	2002 XU_{109}	—	December 6, 2002	Socorro	LINEAR	MRX	1.8 km	MPC · JPL
174459	2002 YL_{4}	—	December 29, 2002	Socorro	LINEAR	·	4.0 km	MPC · JPL
174460	2002 YQ_{9}	—	December 31, 2002	Socorro	LINEAR	·	2.7 km	MPC · JPL
174461	2002 YO_{11}	—	December 31, 2002	Socorro	LINEAR	H	1.1 km	MPC · JPL
174462	2002 YB_{16}	—	December 31, 2002	Socorro	LINEAR	GEF	2.0 km	MPC · JPL
174463	2002 YV_{18}	—	December 31, 2002	Socorro	LINEAR	·	3.9 km	MPC · JPL
174464	2002 YM_{22}	—	December 31, 2002	Socorro	LINEAR	·	2.5 km	MPC · JPL
174465	2002 YK_{32}	—	December 27, 2002	Palomar	NEAT	·	8.0 km	MPC · JPL
174466 Zucker	2002 YO_{36}	Zucker	December 31, 2002	Apache Point	SDSS	·	5.4 km	MPC · JPL
174467	2002 YP_{36}	—	December 31, 2002	Socorro	LINEAR	·	3.8 km	MPC · JPL
174468	2003 AP_{1}	—	January 1, 2003	Socorro	LINEAR	·	6.5 km	MPC · JPL
174469	2003 AP_{6}	—	January 1, 2003	Kitt Peak	Spacewatch	·	4.9 km	MPC · JPL
174470	2003 AY_{7}	—	January 2, 2003	Socorro	LINEAR	H	1.2 km	MPC · JPL
174471	2003 AM_{12}	—	January 1, 2003	Socorro	LINEAR	GEF	2.1 km	MPC · JPL
174472	2003 AX_{12}	—	January 1, 2003	Socorro	LINEAR	EUP	7.9 km	MPC · JPL
174473	2003 AX_{16}	—	January 6, 2003	Needville	Needville	HYG	3.2 km	MPC · JPL
174474	2003 AR_{17}	—	January 5, 2003	Anderson Mesa	LONEOS	·	4.5 km	MPC · JPL
174475	2003 AY_{19}	—	January 5, 2003	Socorro	LINEAR	·	3.7 km	MPC · JPL
174476	2003 AJ_{21}	—	January 5, 2003	Socorro	LINEAR	·	4.9 km	MPC · JPL
174477	2003 AP_{24}	—	January 4, 2003	Socorro	LINEAR	·	2.9 km	MPC · JPL
174478	2003 AN_{27}	—	January 4, 2003	Socorro	LINEAR	·	2.7 km	MPC · JPL
174479	2003 AZ_{34}	—	January 7, 2003	Socorro	LINEAR	NAE	6.1 km	MPC · JPL
174480	2003 AH_{40}	—	January 7, 2003	Socorro	LINEAR	·	5.5 km	MPC · JPL
174481	2003 AO_{56}	—	January 5, 2003	Socorro	LINEAR	·	4.9 km	MPC · JPL
174482	2003 AJ_{59}	—	January 5, 2003	Socorro	LINEAR	·	5.6 km	MPC · JPL
174483	2003 AP_{59}	—	January 5, 2003	Socorro	LINEAR	·	5.1 km	MPC · JPL
174484	2003 AG_{68}	—	January 8, 2003	Socorro	LINEAR	·	3.0 km	MPC · JPL
174485	2003 AU_{68}	—	January 9, 2003	Socorro	LINEAR	·	3.6 km	MPC · JPL
174486	2003 AU_{78}	—	January 10, 2003	Socorro	LINEAR	·	4.3 km	MPC · JPL
174487	2003 AH_{94}	—	January 10, 2003	Socorro	LINEAR	EOS	3.0 km	MPC · JPL
174488	2003 BX_{1}	—	January 23, 2003	Kitt Peak	Spacewatch	TIR	3.5 km	MPC · JPL
174489	2003 BV_{10}	—	January 26, 2003	Anderson Mesa	LONEOS	·	4.5 km	MPC · JPL
174490	2003 BV_{11}	—	January 26, 2003	Anderson Mesa	LONEOS	·	7.6 km	MPC · JPL
174491	2003 BB_{12}	—	January 26, 2003	Anderson Mesa	LONEOS	EOS	3.6 km	MPC · JPL
174492	2003 BF_{13}	—	January 26, 2003	Haleakala	NEAT	EOS	3.2 km	MPC · JPL
174493	2003 BT_{15}	—	January 26, 2003	Anderson Mesa	LONEOS	·	6.4 km	MPC · JPL
174494	2003 BY_{16}	—	January 26, 2003	Haleakala	NEAT	·	6.2 km	MPC · JPL
174495	2003 BZ_{16}	—	January 26, 2003	Haleakala	NEAT	·	4.9 km	MPC · JPL
174496	2003 BW_{19}	—	January 26, 2003	Haleakala	NEAT	·	6.2 km	MPC · JPL
174497	2003 BG_{22}	—	January 25, 2003	Palomar	NEAT	·	4.6 km	MPC · JPL
174498	2003 BK_{38}	—	January 27, 2003	Anderson Mesa	LONEOS	·	2.8 km	MPC · JPL
174499	2003 BY_{38}	—	January 27, 2003	Socorro	LINEAR	·	7.0 km	MPC · JPL
174500	2003 BN_{42}	—	January 28, 2003	Socorro	LINEAR	·	5.1 km	MPC · JPL

== 174501–174600 ==
back to top

Designation			Discovery			Properties		Ref
Permanent	Provisional	Named after	Date	Site	Discoverer(s)	Category	Diam.	Ref
174501	2003 BZ_{43}	—	January 28, 2003	Palomar	NEAT	EOS	3.2 km	MPC · JPL
174502	2003 BQ_{51}	—	January 27, 2003	Socorro	LINEAR	·	5.6 km	MPC · JPL
174503	2003 BH_{53}	—	January 27, 2003	Socorro	LINEAR	·	3.9 km	MPC · JPL
174504	2003 BD_{55}	—	January 27, 2003	Haleakala	NEAT	·	5.2 km	MPC · JPL
174505	2003 BU_{55}	—	January 28, 2003	Socorro	LINEAR	·	4.6 km	MPC · JPL
174506	2003 BK_{58}	—	January 27, 2003	Socorro	LINEAR	EOS	2.8 km	MPC · JPL
174507	2003 BN_{63}	—	January 28, 2003	Kitt Peak	Spacewatch	·	4.8 km	MPC · JPL
174508	2003 BS_{63}	—	January 28, 2003	Palomar	NEAT	·	2.8 km	MPC · JPL
174509	2003 BU_{64}	—	January 30, 2003	Anderson Mesa	LONEOS	THM	3.5 km	MPC · JPL
174510	2003 BR_{68}	—	January 28, 2003	Kitt Peak	Spacewatch	·	3.8 km	MPC · JPL
174511	2003 BH_{77}	—	January 30, 2003	Anderson Mesa	LONEOS	TIR	3.8 km	MPC · JPL
174512	2003 BC_{78}	—	January 30, 2003	Haleakala	NEAT	EOS	3.5 km	MPC · JPL
174513	2003 BO_{81}	—	January 31, 2003	Socorro	LINEAR	·	4.3 km	MPC · JPL
174514	2003 BZ_{91}	—	January 26, 2003	Anderson Mesa	LONEOS	·	6.4 km	MPC · JPL
174515 Pamelaivezić	2003 BN_{92}	Pamelaivezić	January 28, 2003	Apache Point	SDSS	·	3.5 km	MPC · JPL
174516	2003 CV_{7}	—	February 1, 2003	Socorro	LINEAR	·	4.0 km	MPC · JPL
174517	2003 CK_{8}	—	February 1, 2003	Socorro	LINEAR	·	3.5 km	MPC · JPL
174518	2003 CB_{18}	—	February 8, 2003	Socorro	LINEAR	·	3.0 km	MPC · JPL
174519	2003 CV_{25}	—	February 9, 2003	Kitt Peak	Spacewatch	·	3.4 km	MPC · JPL
174520	2003 DY_{3}	—	February 22, 2003	Palomar	NEAT	·	4.7 km	MPC · JPL
174521	2003 DQ_{14}	—	February 24, 2003	Haleakala	NEAT	·	4.8 km	MPC · JPL
174522	2003 DD_{17}	—	February 22, 2003	Anderson Mesa	LONEOS	·	2.5 km	MPC · JPL
174523	2003 DE_{17}	—	February 22, 2003	Anderson Mesa	LONEOS	·	5.7 km	MPC · JPL
174524	2003 DO_{19}	—	February 22, 2003	Palomar	NEAT	EOS	4.7 km	MPC · JPL
174525	2003 DZ_{19}	—	February 22, 2003	Palomar	NEAT	·	5.6 km	MPC · JPL
174526	2003 DK_{20}	—	February 22, 2003	Palomar	NEAT	·	4.6 km	MPC · JPL
174527	2003 EZ_{6}	—	March 6, 2003	Anderson Mesa	LONEOS	·	6.5 km	MPC · JPL
174528	2003 EL_{15}	—	March 7, 2003	Socorro	LINEAR	·	4.4 km	MPC · JPL
174529	2003 EF_{21}	—	March 6, 2003	Anderson Mesa	LONEOS	·	6.0 km	MPC · JPL
174530	2003 EA_{25}	—	March 6, 2003	Anderson Mesa	LONEOS	·	3.8 km	MPC · JPL
174531	2003 EW_{27}	—	March 6, 2003	Socorro	LINEAR	·	6.1 km	MPC · JPL
174532	2003 EA_{29}	—	March 6, 2003	Socorro	LINEAR	(159)	5.2 km	MPC · JPL
174533	2003 EU_{29}	—	March 6, 2003	Socorro	LINEAR	·	6.9 km	MPC · JPL
174534	2003 EY_{32}	—	March 7, 2003	Anderson Mesa	LONEOS	VER	5.5 km	MPC · JPL
174535	2003 EF_{37}	—	March 8, 2003	Anderson Mesa	LONEOS	·	5.1 km	MPC · JPL
174536	2003 EB_{41}	—	March 8, 2003	Palomar	NEAT	·	4.4 km	MPC · JPL
174537	2003 EW_{43}	—	March 6, 2003	Socorro	LINEAR	·	3.3 km	MPC · JPL
174538	2003 ED_{47}	—	March 8, 2003	Socorro	LINEAR	·	5.8 km	MPC · JPL
174539	2003 EH_{57}	—	March 9, 2003	Anderson Mesa	LONEOS	·	4.3 km	MPC · JPL
174540	2003 EM_{60}	—	March 12, 2003	Socorro	LINEAR	·	3.8 km	MPC · JPL
174541	2003 EZ_{61}	—	March 7, 2003	Socorro	LINEAR	EOS	3.1 km	MPC · JPL
174542	2003 FE	—	March 22, 2003	Palomar	NEAT	·	10 km	MPC · JPL
174543	2003 FF_{10}	—	March 23, 2003	Kitt Peak	Spacewatch	·	3.3 km	MPC · JPL
174544	2003 FL_{26}	—	March 24, 2003	Kitt Peak	Spacewatch	·	4.0 km	MPC · JPL
174545	2003 FD_{51}	—	March 25, 2003	Palomar	NEAT	·	3.7 km	MPC · JPL
174546	2003 FL_{55}	—	March 26, 2003	Palomar	NEAT	·	4.4 km	MPC · JPL
174547	2003 FF_{62}	—	March 26, 2003	Palomar	NEAT	·	4.4 km	MPC · JPL
174548	2003 FT_{66}	—	March 26, 2003	Palomar	NEAT	·	4.8 km	MPC · JPL
174549	2003 FN_{67}	—	March 26, 2003	Palomar	NEAT	EOS	3.0 km	MPC · JPL
174550	2003 FT_{71}	—	March 26, 2003	Kitt Peak	Spacewatch	·	4.0 km	MPC · JPL
174551	2003 FH_{75}	—	March 27, 2003	Campo Imperatore	CINEOS	·	6.3 km	MPC · JPL
174552	2003 FP_{83}	—	March 27, 2003	Kitt Peak	Spacewatch	·	9.0 km	MPC · JPL
174553	2003 FR_{85}	—	March 28, 2003	Anderson Mesa	LONEOS	·	5.4 km	MPC · JPL
174554	2003 FB_{86}	—	March 28, 2003	Catalina	CSS	·	4.2 km	MPC · JPL
174555	2003 FO_{89}	—	March 29, 2003	Anderson Mesa	LONEOS	·	3.8 km	MPC · JPL
174556	2003 FT_{95}	—	March 30, 2003	Anderson Mesa	LONEOS	·	4.4 km	MPC · JPL
174557	2003 FR_{98}	—	March 30, 2003	Socorro	LINEAR	·	4.2 km	MPC · JPL
174558	2003 FB_{99}	—	March 30, 2003	Socorro	LINEAR	HYG	5.0 km	MPC · JPL
174559	2003 FZ_{100}	—	March 31, 2003	Anderson Mesa	LONEOS	·	4.5 km	MPC · JPL
174560	2003 FM_{101}	—	March 31, 2003	Socorro	LINEAR	·	4.4 km	MPC · JPL
174561	2003 FG_{130}	—	March 27, 2003	Palomar	NEAT	·	5.9 km	MPC · JPL
174562	2003 GQ_{5}	—	April 1, 2003	Socorro	LINEAR	·	4.3 km	MPC · JPL
174563	2003 GL_{12}	—	April 1, 2003	Socorro	LINEAR	·	7.8 km	MPC · JPL
174564	2003 GE_{16}	—	April 2, 2003	Haleakala	NEAT	·	4.3 km	MPC · JPL
174565	2003 HC	—	April 20, 2003	Haleakala	NEAT	LIX	6.4 km	MPC · JPL
174566	2003 KT_{16}	—	May 28, 2003	Haleakala	NEAT	·	1.4 km	MPC · JPL
174567 Varda	2003 MW_{12}	Varda	June 21, 2003	Kitt Peak	J. A. Larsen	cubewano (hot) · moon	740 km	MPC · JPL
174568	2003 NO_{12}	—	July 5, 2003	Kitt Peak	Spacewatch	NYS	1.5 km	MPC · JPL
174569	2003 NQ_{12}	—	July 5, 2003	Kitt Peak	Spacewatch	·	910 m	MPC · JPL
174570	2003 OH_{1}	—	July 18, 2003	Haleakala	NEAT	PHO	2.7 km	MPC · JPL
174571	2003 OV_{12}	—	July 28, 2003	Palomar	NEAT	·	1.4 km	MPC · JPL
174572	2003 OH_{22}	—	July 29, 2003	Socorro	LINEAR	·	2.0 km	MPC · JPL
174573	2003 OM_{22}	—	July 30, 2003	Socorro	LINEAR	·	2.0 km	MPC · JPL
174574	2003 OW_{22}	—	July 30, 2003	Socorro	LINEAR	·	2.0 km	MPC · JPL
174575	2003 OA_{27}	—	July 24, 2003	Palomar	NEAT	·	1.4 km	MPC · JPL
174576	2003 OA_{29}	—	July 24, 2003	Palomar	NEAT	·	1.2 km	MPC · JPL
174577	2003 OH_{31}	—	July 30, 2003	Socorro	LINEAR	·	1.3 km	MPC · JPL
174578	2003 PQ_{5}	—	August 1, 2003	Socorro	LINEAR	·	1.4 km	MPC · JPL
174579	2003 QM_{17}	—	August 22, 2003	Palomar	NEAT	·	1.2 km	MPC · JPL
174580	2003 QR_{18}	—	August 22, 2003	Palomar	NEAT	·	1.7 km	MPC · JPL
174581	2003 QX_{22}	—	August 20, 2003	Palomar	NEAT	ERI	2.9 km	MPC · JPL
174582	2003 QC_{25}	—	August 22, 2003	Palomar	NEAT	·	2.6 km	MPC · JPL
174583	2003 QO_{30}	—	August 22, 2003	Palomar	NEAT	·	1.0 km	MPC · JPL
174584	2003 QH_{34}	—	August 22, 2003	Palomar	NEAT	·	1.4 km	MPC · JPL
174585	2003 QN_{37}	—	August 22, 2003	Palomar	NEAT	NYS	1.4 km	MPC · JPL
174586	2003 QQ_{39}	—	August 22, 2003	Socorro	LINEAR	·	1.3 km	MPC · JPL
174587	2003 QF_{42}	—	August 22, 2003	Socorro	LINEAR	NYS	1.6 km	MPC · JPL
174588	2003 QM_{42}	—	August 22, 2003	Socorro	LINEAR	·	1.7 km	MPC · JPL
174589	2003 QY_{45}	—	August 23, 2003	Socorro	LINEAR	·	1.3 km	MPC · JPL
174590	2003 QD_{46}	—	August 23, 2003	Palomar	NEAT	·	1.6 km	MPC · JPL
174591	2003 QL_{46}	—	August 23, 2003	Socorro	LINEAR	·	1.6 km	MPC · JPL
174592	2003 QR_{53}	—	August 23, 2003	Socorro	LINEAR	·	1.1 km	MPC · JPL
174593	2003 QB_{56}	—	August 23, 2003	Socorro	LINEAR	·	1.2 km	MPC · JPL
174594	2003 QH_{56}	—	August 23, 2003	Socorro	LINEAR	·	3.0 km	MPC · JPL
174595	2003 QK_{59}	—	August 23, 2003	Socorro	LINEAR	·	1.3 km	MPC · JPL
174596	2003 QC_{65}	—	August 23, 2003	Palomar	NEAT	·	1.2 km	MPC · JPL
174597	2003 QD_{67}	—	August 23, 2003	Socorro	LINEAR	(1338) (FLO)	850 m	MPC · JPL
174598	2003 QR_{67}	—	August 24, 2003	Socorro	LINEAR	·	1.3 km	MPC · JPL
174599	2003 QM_{70}	—	August 21, 2003	Socorro	LINEAR	·	3.2 km	MPC · JPL
174600	2003 QH_{76}	—	August 24, 2003	Socorro	LINEAR	(1338) (FLO)	880 m	MPC · JPL

== 174601–174700 ==
back to top

Designation			Discovery			Properties		Ref
Permanent	Provisional	Named after	Date	Site	Discoverer(s)	Category	Diam.	Ref
174601	2003 QA_{78}	—	August 24, 2003	Socorro	LINEAR	·	1.9 km	MPC · JPL
174602	2003 QM_{107}	—	August 31, 2003	Socorro	LINEAR	·	1.6 km	MPC · JPL
174603	2003 QN_{111}	—	August 31, 2003	Socorro	LINEAR	PHO	3.9 km	MPC · JPL
174604	2003 QO_{111}	—	August 31, 2003	Socorro	LINEAR	·	1.1 km	MPC · JPL
174605	2003 RT_{5}	—	September 3, 2003	Haleakala	NEAT	·	2.6 km	MPC · JPL
174606	2003 RP_{21}	—	September 13, 2003	Haleakala	NEAT	·	1.5 km	MPC · JPL
174607	2003 RE_{27}	—	September 3, 2003	Socorro	LINEAR	·	1.7 km	MPC · JPL
174608	2003 SY_{5}	—	September 16, 2003	Palomar	NEAT	·	1.8 km	MPC · JPL
174609	2003 SZ_{25}	—	September 17, 2003	Haleakala	NEAT	·	1.2 km	MPC · JPL
174610	2003 SB_{36}	—	September 18, 2003	Socorro	LINEAR	·	1.5 km	MPC · JPL
174611	2003 SV_{36}	—	September 19, 2003	Desert Eagle	W. K. Y. Yeung	·	1.1 km	MPC · JPL
174612	2003 SM_{39}	—	September 16, 2003	Palomar	NEAT	·	1.6 km	MPC · JPL
174613	2003 SH_{41}	—	September 17, 2003	Palomar	NEAT	·	3.9 km	MPC · JPL
174614	2003 SQ_{43}	—	September 16, 2003	Anderson Mesa	LONEOS	·	940 m	MPC · JPL
174615	2003 SO_{44}	—	September 16, 2003	Anderson Mesa	LONEOS	·	2.0 km	MPC · JPL
174616	2003 SQ_{51}	—	September 18, 2003	Palomar	NEAT	·	1.2 km	MPC · JPL
174617	2003 SX_{51}	—	September 18, 2003	Palomar	NEAT	MAS	1.2 km	MPC · JPL
174618	2003 SC_{52}	—	September 18, 2003	Palomar	NEAT	·	1.2 km	MPC · JPL
174619	2003 SH_{64}	—	September 18, 2003	Campo Imperatore	CINEOS	(2076)	1.8 km	MPC · JPL
174620	2003 SB_{66}	—	September 18, 2003	Socorro	LINEAR	·	2.0 km	MPC · JPL
174621	2003 SX_{66}	—	September 19, 2003	Campo Imperatore	CINEOS	·	1.5 km	MPC · JPL
174622	2003 SN_{67}	—	September 19, 2003	Socorro	LINEAR	·	1.4 km	MPC · JPL
174623	2003 SC_{74}	—	September 18, 2003	Kitt Peak	Spacewatch	·	1.0 km	MPC · JPL
174624	2003 SY_{74}	—	September 18, 2003	Kitt Peak	Spacewatch	·	1.0 km	MPC · JPL
174625	2003 ST_{76}	—	September 19, 2003	Uccle	Uccle	·	2.0 km	MPC · JPL
174626	2003 SN_{77}	—	September 19, 2003	Kitt Peak	Spacewatch	·	2.0 km	MPC · JPL
174627	2003 SQ_{79}	—	September 19, 2003	Kitt Peak	Spacewatch	·	1.1 km	MPC · JPL
174628	2003 ST_{91}	—	September 18, 2003	Palomar	NEAT	·	2.1 km	MPC · JPL
174629	2003 SD_{92}	—	September 18, 2003	Kitt Peak	Spacewatch	·	1.1 km	MPC · JPL
174630	2003 SJ_{93}	—	September 18, 2003	Kitt Peak	Spacewatch	(1338) (FLO)	1.1 km	MPC · JPL
174631	2003 SD_{108}	—	September 20, 2003	Palomar	NEAT	·	1.1 km	MPC · JPL
174632	2003 SK_{110}	—	September 20, 2003	Palomar	NEAT	·	1.5 km	MPC · JPL
174633	2003 SM_{110}	—	September 20, 2003	Palomar	NEAT	ERI	2.7 km	MPC · JPL
174634	2003 SC_{111}	—	September 20, 2003	Haleakala	NEAT	·	1.5 km	MPC · JPL
174635	2003 SZ_{124}	—	September 19, 2003	Campo Imperatore	CINEOS	V	990 m	MPC · JPL
174636	2003 SU_{125}	—	September 19, 2003	Socorro	LINEAR	MAS	1.1 km	MPC · JPL
174637	2003 SK_{137}	—	September 20, 2003	Palomar	NEAT	·	1.2 km	MPC · JPL
174638	2003 SG_{138}	—	September 19, 2003	Socorro	LINEAR	·	3.6 km	MPC · JPL
174639	2003 SA_{139}	—	September 21, 2003	Socorro	LINEAR	·	1.1 km	MPC · JPL
174640	2003 SN_{141}	—	September 19, 2003	Kitt Peak	Spacewatch	NYS	1.2 km	MPC · JPL
174641	2003 SU_{141}	—	September 20, 2003	Campo Imperatore	CINEOS	·	3.5 km	MPC · JPL
174642	2003 SL_{142}	—	September 20, 2003	Socorro	LINEAR	NYS	2.3 km	MPC · JPL
174643	2003 SF_{145}	—	September 19, 2003	Haleakala	NEAT	·	1.7 km	MPC · JPL
174644	2003 SD_{155}	—	September 19, 2003	Anderson Mesa	LONEOS	NYS	1.6 km	MPC · JPL
174645	2003 SH_{161}	—	September 18, 2003	Socorro	LINEAR	NYS	1.9 km	MPC · JPL
174646	2003 SO_{164}	—	September 20, 2003	Anderson Mesa	LONEOS	MAS	1 km	MPC · JPL
174647	2003 SX_{167}	—	September 23, 2003	Haleakala	NEAT	·	2.1 km	MPC · JPL
174648	2003 SO_{169}	—	September 23, 2003	Haleakala	NEAT	HNS	2.5 km	MPC · JPL
174649	2003 SA_{173}	—	September 18, 2003	Socorro	LINEAR	NYS	1.3 km	MPC · JPL
174650	2003 SK_{181}	—	September 20, 2003	Socorro	LINEAR	·	1.6 km	MPC · JPL
174651	2003 SJ_{189}	—	September 22, 2003	Palomar	NEAT	NYS	1.8 km	MPC · JPL
174652	2003 SJ_{190}	—	September 24, 2003	Haleakala	NEAT	V	1.3 km	MPC · JPL
174653	2003 SC_{191}	—	September 18, 2003	Palomar	NEAT	·	1.3 km	MPC · JPL
174654	2003 SL_{192}	—	September 20, 2003	Campo Imperatore	CINEOS	·	1.4 km	MPC · JPL
174655	2003 SZ_{194}	—	September 20, 2003	Haleakala	NEAT	V	1.3 km	MPC · JPL
174656	2003 SD_{195}	—	September 20, 2003	Palomar	NEAT	·	1.4 km	MPC · JPL
174657	2003 ST_{199}	—	September 21, 2003	Anderson Mesa	LONEOS	·	2.2 km	MPC · JPL
174658	2003 SH_{204}	—	September 22, 2003	Socorro	LINEAR	·	2.4 km	MPC · JPL
174659	2003 SV_{207}	—	September 26, 2003	Socorro	LINEAR	slow	3.3 km	MPC · JPL
174660	2003 SW_{209}	—	September 25, 2003	Haleakala	NEAT	(2076)	2.2 km	MPC · JPL
174661	2003 SM_{210}	—	September 26, 2003	Socorro	LINEAR	·	1.1 km	MPC · JPL
174662	2003 SZ_{213}	—	September 26, 2003	Desert Eagle	W. K. Y. Yeung	NYS	1.6 km	MPC · JPL
174663	2003 SY_{216}	—	September 27, 2003	Desert Eagle	W. K. Y. Yeung	·	3.0 km	MPC · JPL
174664	2003 SR_{220}	—	September 29, 2003	Desert Eagle	W. K. Y. Yeung	MAS	1.2 km	MPC · JPL
174665	2003 SC_{225}	—	September 25, 2003	Haleakala	NEAT	·	1.3 km	MPC · JPL
174666	2003 SR_{230}	—	September 24, 2003	Palomar	NEAT	·	1.5 km	MPC · JPL
174667	2003 SN_{232}	—	September 24, 2003	Haleakala	NEAT	MAS	1.2 km	MPC · JPL
174668	2003 SQ_{233}	—	September 25, 2003	Palomar	NEAT	·	1.8 km	MPC · JPL
174669	2003 SY_{246}	—	September 26, 2003	Socorro	LINEAR	·	1.5 km	MPC · JPL
174670	2003 SA_{249}	—	September 26, 2003	Socorro	LINEAR	·	2.0 km	MPC · JPL
174671	2003 SW_{251}	—	September 26, 2003	Socorro	LINEAR	NYS	2.0 km	MPC · JPL
174672	2003 SB_{252}	—	September 26, 2003	Socorro	LINEAR	·	1.7 km	MPC · JPL
174673	2003 SO_{255}	—	September 27, 2003	Kitt Peak	Spacewatch	MAS	960 m	MPC · JPL
174674	2003 SD_{260}	—	September 29, 2003	Socorro	LINEAR	·	1.8 km	MPC · JPL
174675	2003 SB_{270}	—	September 24, 2003	Haleakala	NEAT	PHO	2.6 km	MPC · JPL
174676	2003 SE_{284}	—	September 20, 2003	Socorro	LINEAR	·	1.2 km	MPC · JPL
174677	2003 SA_{297}	—	September 16, 2003	Palomar	NEAT	·	1.8 km	MPC · JPL
174678	2003 SB_{303}	—	September 17, 2003	Palomar	NEAT	·	1.2 km	MPC · JPL
174679	2003 SD_{303}	—	September 17, 2003	Palomar	NEAT	V	1.1 km	MPC · JPL
174680	2003 SC_{304}	—	September 17, 2003	Palomar	NEAT	·	3.0 km	MPC · JPL
174681	2003 SO_{309}	—	September 27, 2003	Socorro	LINEAR	·	1.4 km	MPC · JPL
174682	2003 SJ_{311}	—	September 29, 2003	Socorro	LINEAR	·	810 m	MPC · JPL
174683	2003 TD_{7}	—	October 1, 2003	Anderson Mesa	LONEOS	·	1.5 km	MPC · JPL
174684	2003 TL_{9}	—	October 5, 2003	Haleakala	NEAT	·	1.3 km	MPC · JPL
174685	2003 TL_{20}	—	October 14, 2003	Palomar	NEAT	·	3.0 km	MPC · JPL
174686	2003 TM_{37}	—	October 2, 2003	Kitt Peak	Spacewatch	·	1.6 km	MPC · JPL
174687	2003 UV_{9}	—	October 20, 2003	Nashville	Clingan, R.	·	1.1 km	MPC · JPL
174688	2003 UR_{14}	—	October 16, 2003	Anderson Mesa	LONEOS	V	1.0 km	MPC · JPL
174689	2003 UM_{15}	—	October 16, 2003	Anderson Mesa	LONEOS	·	1.9 km	MPC · JPL
174690	2003 UG_{19}	—	October 20, 2003	Kitt Peak	Spacewatch	NYS	1.9 km	MPC · JPL
174691	2003 US_{22}	—	October 23, 2003	Anderson Mesa	LONEOS	·	1.1 km	MPC · JPL
174692	2003 UY_{25}	—	October 22, 2003	Kitt Peak	Spacewatch	·	980 m	MPC · JPL
174693	2003 UW_{27}	—	October 22, 2003	Goodricke-Pigott	R. A. Tucker	·	1.2 km	MPC · JPL
174694	2003 UP_{40}	—	October 16, 2003	Anderson Mesa	LONEOS	MAS	1.3 km	MPC · JPL
174695	2003 UG_{47}	—	October 16, 2003	Goodricke-Pigott	R. A. Tucker	·	1.3 km	MPC · JPL
174696	2003 UW_{53}	—	October 18, 2003	Palomar	NEAT	·	1.4 km	MPC · JPL
174697	2003 UC_{58}	—	October 16, 2003	Kitt Peak	Spacewatch	·	1.2 km	MPC · JPL
174698	2003 UV_{60}	—	October 16, 2003	Palomar	NEAT	·	1.7 km	MPC · JPL
174699	2003 UY_{64}	—	October 16, 2003	Anderson Mesa	LONEOS	·	5.3 km	MPC · JPL
174700	2003 UJ_{68}	—	October 16, 2003	Anderson Mesa	LONEOS	·	2.6 km	MPC · JPL

== 174701–174800 ==
back to top

Designation			Discovery			Properties		Ref
Permanent	Provisional	Named after	Date	Site	Discoverer(s)	Category	Diam.	Ref
174701	2003 UV_{77}	—	October 17, 2003	Kitt Peak	Spacewatch	·	1.3 km	MPC · JPL
174702	2003 UX_{81}	—	October 18, 2003	Kitt Peak	Spacewatch	·	1.4 km	MPC · JPL
174703	2003 UR_{91}	—	October 20, 2003	Kitt Peak	Spacewatch	·	1.1 km	MPC · JPL
174704	2003 UW_{97}	—	October 19, 2003	Kitt Peak	Spacewatch	·	1.5 km	MPC · JPL
174705	2003 UG_{100}	—	October 19, 2003	Palomar	NEAT	·	1.3 km	MPC · JPL
174706	2003 US_{102}	—	October 20, 2003	Kitt Peak	Spacewatch	·	1.6 km	MPC · JPL
174707	2003 UP_{103}	—	October 20, 2003	Palomar	NEAT	·	1.7 km	MPC · JPL
174708	2003 UA_{104}	—	October 17, 2003	Anderson Mesa	LONEOS	·	2.0 km	MPC · JPL
174709	2003 UK_{112}	—	October 20, 2003	Socorro	LINEAR	·	1.9 km	MPC · JPL
174710	2003 UX_{113}	—	October 20, 2003	Socorro	LINEAR	·	2.3 km	MPC · JPL
174711	2003 UK_{117}	—	October 21, 2003	Socorro	LINEAR	·	1.1 km	MPC · JPL
174712	2003 UQ_{129}	—	October 18, 2003	Palomar	NEAT	·	1.3 km	MPC · JPL
174713	2003 UA_{133}	—	October 19, 2003	Palomar	NEAT	·	2.4 km	MPC · JPL
174714	2003 UU_{136}	—	October 21, 2003	Socorro	LINEAR	·	1.3 km	MPC · JPL
174715	2003 UM_{142}	—	October 18, 2003	Anderson Mesa	LONEOS	·	2.1 km	MPC · JPL
174716	2003 UV_{142}	—	October 18, 2003	Anderson Mesa	LONEOS	V	1.0 km	MPC · JPL
174717	2003 UU_{144}	—	October 18, 2003	Anderson Mesa	LONEOS	·	1.3 km	MPC · JPL
174718	2003 UD_{146}	—	October 18, 2003	Anderson Mesa	LONEOS	·	1.8 km	MPC · JPL
174719	2003 UP_{149}	—	October 20, 2003	Socorro	LINEAR	·	1.6 km	MPC · JPL
174720	2003 UD_{151}	—	October 21, 2003	Socorro	LINEAR	NYS	1.2 km	MPC · JPL
174721	2003 UF_{151}	—	October 21, 2003	Socorro	LINEAR	·	2.8 km	MPC · JPL
174722	2003 UB_{158}	—	October 20, 2003	Kitt Peak	Spacewatch	NYS ·	1.5 km	MPC · JPL
174723	2003 UG_{159}	—	October 20, 2003	Kitt Peak	Spacewatch	·	1.7 km	MPC · JPL
174724	2003 UZ_{160}	—	October 21, 2003	Kitt Peak	Spacewatch	·	2.0 km	MPC · JPL
174725	2003 UL_{162}	—	October 21, 2003	Socorro	LINEAR	NYS ·	2.9 km	MPC · JPL
174726	2003 UX_{162}	—	October 21, 2003	Socorro	LINEAR	·	1.4 km	MPC · JPL
174727	2003 UU_{168}	—	October 22, 2003	Socorro	LINEAR	MAS	1.1 km	MPC · JPL
174728	2003 UB_{181}	—	October 21, 2003	Socorro	LINEAR	MAS	1.1 km	MPC · JPL
174729	2003 UB_{182}	—	October 21, 2003	Socorro	LINEAR	·	1.4 km	MPC · JPL
174730	2003 UJ_{182}	—	October 21, 2003	Palomar	NEAT	·	1.2 km	MPC · JPL
174731	2003 UH_{183}	—	October 21, 2003	Palomar	NEAT	·	1.1 km	MPC · JPL
174732	2003 UN_{187}	—	October 22, 2003	Socorro	LINEAR	·	2.8 km	MPC · JPL
174733	2003 UH_{188}	—	October 22, 2003	Socorro	LINEAR	·	1.6 km	MPC · JPL
174734	2003 UO_{190}	—	October 23, 2003	Kvistaberg	Uppsala-DLR Asteroid Survey	·	2.2 km	MPC · JPL
174735	2003 UV_{195}	—	October 20, 2003	Kitt Peak	Spacewatch	MAS	1.0 km	MPC · JPL
174736	2003 UB_{210}	—	October 23, 2003	Anderson Mesa	LONEOS	·	1.5 km	MPC · JPL
174737	2003 UR_{213}	—	October 24, 2003	Socorro	LINEAR	·	1.4 km	MPC · JPL
174738	2003 UZ_{217}	—	October 21, 2003	Socorro	LINEAR	·	3.1 km	MPC · JPL
174739	2003 UX_{222}	—	October 22, 2003	Socorro	LINEAR	V	920 m	MPC · JPL
174740	2003 UY_{228}	—	October 23, 2003	Anderson Mesa	LONEOS	MRX	1.9 km	MPC · JPL
174741	2003 UR_{230}	—	October 23, 2003	Kitt Peak	Spacewatch	·	1.8 km	MPC · JPL
174742	2003 UP_{231}	—	October 24, 2003	Socorro	LINEAR	·	1.1 km	MPC · JPL
174743	2003 UA_{235}	—	October 24, 2003	Socorro	LINEAR	·	2.1 km	MPC · JPL
174744	2003 UA_{237}	—	October 23, 2003	Anderson Mesa	LONEOS	·	1.7 km	MPC · JPL
174745	2003 UH_{241}	—	October 24, 2003	Haleakala	NEAT	·	1.2 km	MPC · JPL
174746	2003 UE_{242}	—	October 24, 2003	Socorro	LINEAR	·	1.4 km	MPC · JPL
174747	2003 UE_{253}	—	October 27, 2003	Socorro	LINEAR	·	1.5 km	MPC · JPL
174748	2003 UX_{264}	—	October 27, 2003	Socorro	LINEAR	·	2.2 km	MPC · JPL
174749	2003 UC_{265}	—	October 27, 2003	Socorro	LINEAR	·	1.7 km	MPC · JPL
174750	2003 UR_{275}	—	October 29, 2003	Catalina	CSS	·	1.0 km	MPC · JPL
174751	2003 UQ_{276}	—	October 30, 2003	Socorro	LINEAR	·	1.5 km	MPC · JPL
174752	2003 UN_{281}	—	October 28, 2003	Haleakala	NEAT	·	2.1 km	MPC · JPL
174753	2003 UH_{282}	—	October 29, 2003	Anderson Mesa	LONEOS	·	2.0 km	MPC · JPL
174754	2003 UA_{283}	—	October 29, 2003	Anderson Mesa	LONEOS	·	1.3 km	MPC · JPL
174755	2003 UN_{297}	—	October 16, 2003	Kitt Peak	Spacewatch	·	1.1 km	MPC · JPL
174756	2003 VN	—	November 1, 2003	Socorro	LINEAR	·	1.5 km	MPC · JPL
174757	2003 VK_{2}	—	November 5, 2003	Socorro	LINEAR	·	1.3 km	MPC · JPL
174758	2003 VX_{2}	—	November 14, 2003	Wrightwood	J. W. Young	·	1.4 km	MPC · JPL
174759	2003 VT_{4}	—	November 15, 2003	Kitt Peak	Spacewatch	V	1.0 km	MPC · JPL
174760	2003 VP_{9}	—	November 15, 2003	Palomar	NEAT	·	1.6 km	MPC · JPL
174761	2003 VX_{11}	—	November 3, 2003	Socorro	LINEAR	·	4.3 km	MPC · JPL
174762	2003 WV_{6}	—	November 18, 2003	Palomar	NEAT	·	1.4 km	MPC · JPL
174763	2003 WY_{9}	—	November 18, 2003	Kitt Peak	Spacewatch	V	960 m	MPC · JPL
174764	2003 WK_{25}	—	November 21, 2003	Desert Moon	Stevens, B. L.	·	1.1 km	MPC · JPL
174765	2003 WZ_{25}	—	November 19, 2003	Kingsnake	J. V. McClusky	·	3.9 km	MPC · JPL
174766	2003 WZ_{27}	—	November 16, 2003	Kitt Peak	Spacewatch	·	1.1 km	MPC · JPL
174767	2003 WR_{28}	—	November 16, 2003	Kitt Peak	Spacewatch	NYS	2.4 km	MPC · JPL
174768	2003 WK_{36}	—	November 19, 2003	Kitt Peak	Spacewatch	·	3.1 km	MPC · JPL
174769	2003 WK_{43}	—	November 18, 2003	Palomar	NEAT	·	1.8 km	MPC · JPL
174770	2003 WS_{44}	—	November 19, 2003	Palomar	NEAT	·	2.2 km	MPC · JPL
174771	2003 WC_{45}	—	November 19, 2003	Palomar	NEAT	·	2.2 km	MPC · JPL
174772	2003 WP_{49}	—	November 19, 2003	Socorro	LINEAR	·	1.1 km	MPC · JPL
174773	2003 WF_{53}	—	November 20, 2003	Kitt Peak	Spacewatch	·	1.3 km	MPC · JPL
174774	2003 WN_{55}	—	November 20, 2003	Socorro	LINEAR	·	1.2 km	MPC · JPL
174775	2003 WB_{56}	—	November 20, 2003	Socorro	LINEAR	·	2.2 km	MPC · JPL
174776	2003 WS_{62}	—	November 19, 2003	Kitt Peak	Spacewatch	·	2.1 km	MPC · JPL
174777	2003 WB_{64}	—	November 19, 2003	Kitt Peak	Spacewatch	·	2.9 km	MPC · JPL
174778	2003 WO_{80}	—	November 20, 2003	Socorro	LINEAR	·	2.1 km	MPC · JPL
174779	2003 WV_{82}	—	November 20, 2003	Socorro	LINEAR	·	2.8 km	MPC · JPL
174780	2003 WC_{92}	—	November 18, 2003	Palomar	NEAT	KON	3.8 km	MPC · JPL
174781	2003 WT_{92}	—	November 19, 2003	Anderson Mesa	LONEOS	·	1.4 km	MPC · JPL
174782	2003 WD_{95}	—	November 19, 2003	Anderson Mesa	LONEOS	MAS	950 m	MPC · JPL
174783	2003 WY_{96}	—	November 19, 2003	Anderson Mesa	LONEOS	·	1.9 km	MPC · JPL
174784	2003 WN_{98}	—	November 20, 2003	Palomar	NEAT	·	3.0 km	MPC · JPL
174785	2003 WS_{106}	—	November 21, 2003	Palomar	NEAT	·	2.4 km	MPC · JPL
174786	2003 WB_{111}	—	November 20, 2003	Socorro	LINEAR	·	2.0 km	MPC · JPL
174787	2003 WE_{120}	—	November 20, 2003	Socorro	LINEAR	·	1.8 km	MPC · JPL
174788	2003 WN_{120}	—	November 20, 2003	Socorro	LINEAR	·	1.1 km	MPC · JPL
174789	2003 WN_{121}	—	November 20, 2003	Socorro	LINEAR	V	1.2 km	MPC · JPL
174790	2003 WZ_{123}	—	November 20, 2003	Socorro	LINEAR	·	2.0 km	MPC · JPL
174791	2003 WX_{126}	—	November 20, 2003	Socorro	LINEAR	·	1.4 km	MPC · JPL
174792	2003 WO_{133}	—	November 21, 2003	Socorro	LINEAR	V	950 m	MPC · JPL
174793	2003 WU_{136}	—	November 21, 2003	Socorro	LINEAR	·	1.7 km	MPC · JPL
174794	2003 WM_{139}	—	November 21, 2003	Socorro	LINEAR	·	3.9 km	MPC · JPL
174795	2003 WN_{145}	—	November 21, 2003	Socorro	LINEAR	·	1.4 km	MPC · JPL
174796	2003 WC_{146}	—	November 21, 2003	Kitt Peak	Spacewatch	·	1.3 km	MPC · JPL
174797	2003 WL_{146}	—	November 23, 2003	Catalina	CSS	PHO	3.6 km	MPC · JPL
174798	2003 WQ_{147}	—	November 23, 2003	Kitt Peak	Spacewatch	·	1.7 km	MPC · JPL
174799	2003 WX_{156}	—	November 29, 2003	Kitt Peak	Spacewatch	·	1.3 km	MPC · JPL
174800	2003 WV_{159}	—	November 30, 2003	Kitt Peak	Spacewatch	MAS	880 m	MPC · JPL

== 174801–174900 ==
back to top

Designation			Discovery			Properties		Ref
Permanent	Provisional	Named after	Date	Site	Discoverer(s)	Category	Diam.	Ref
174801 Etscorn	2003 WZ_{165}	Etscorn	November 23, 2003	Etscorn	Ryan, W. H.	·	1.6 km	MPC · JPL
174802	2003 WV_{168}	—	November 19, 2003	Palomar	NEAT	V	1.1 km	MPC · JPL
174803	2003 WN_{171}	—	November 23, 2003	Anderson Mesa	LONEOS	·	1.3 km	MPC · JPL
174804	2003 WJ_{192}	—	November 19, 2003	Socorro	LINEAR	·	1.8 km	MPC · JPL
174805	2003 WN_{192}	—	November 21, 2003	Palomar	NEAT	PHO	3.1 km	MPC · JPL
174806	2003 XL	—	December 3, 2003	Anderson Mesa	LONEOS	AMO +1km	1.3 km	MPC · JPL
174807	2003 XR_{2}	—	December 1, 2003	Socorro	LINEAR	NYS	2.6 km	MPC · JPL
174808	2003 XF_{4}	—	December 1, 2003	Socorro	LINEAR	·	2.2 km	MPC · JPL
174809	2003 XN_{9}	—	December 4, 2003	Socorro	LINEAR	·	2.9 km	MPC · JPL
174810	2003 XZ_{9}	—	December 4, 2003	Socorro	LINEAR	·	3.9 km	MPC · JPL
174811	2003 XD_{12}	—	December 14, 2003	Palomar	NEAT	·	2.7 km	MPC · JPL
174812	2003 XR_{12}	—	December 14, 2003	Palomar	NEAT	·	2.4 km	MPC · JPL
174813	2003 XB_{19}	—	December 14, 2003	Kitt Peak	Spacewatch	·	1.7 km	MPC · JPL
174814	2003 XG_{21}	—	December 14, 2003	Kitt Peak	Spacewatch	·	1.8 km	MPC · JPL
174815	2003 YM_{3}	—	December 19, 2003	Kingsnake	J. V. McClusky	·	3.1 km	MPC · JPL
174816	2003 YX_{12}	—	December 17, 2003	Anderson Mesa	LONEOS	·	2.2 km	MPC · JPL
174817	2003 YJ_{13}	—	December 17, 2003	Anderson Mesa	LONEOS	·	7.6 km	MPC · JPL
174818	2003 YH_{14}	—	December 17, 2003	Palomar	NEAT	·	1.8 km	MPC · JPL
174819	2003 YE_{17}	—	December 17, 2003	Kitt Peak	Spacewatch	·	2.4 km	MPC · JPL
174820	2003 YV_{20}	—	December 17, 2003	Kitt Peak	Spacewatch	MAS	1.0 km	MPC · JPL
174821	2003 YW_{20}	—	December 17, 2003	Kitt Peak	Spacewatch	MAS	1.3 km	MPC · JPL
174822	2003 YW_{28}	—	December 17, 2003	Kitt Peak	Spacewatch	MAS	940 m	MPC · JPL
174823	2003 YV_{33}	—	December 17, 2003	Kitt Peak	Spacewatch	·	3.8 km	MPC · JPL
174824	2003 YA_{36}	—	December 19, 2003	Socorro	LINEAR	·	1.8 km	MPC · JPL
174825	2003 YT_{36}	—	December 17, 2003	Kitt Peak	Spacewatch	(5)	2.2 km	MPC · JPL
174826	2003 YO_{43}	—	December 19, 2003	Socorro	LINEAR	·	2.1 km	MPC · JPL
174827	2003 YV_{46}	—	December 17, 2003	Kitt Peak	Spacewatch	·	2.0 km	MPC · JPL
174828	2003 YN_{58}	—	December 19, 2003	Socorro	LINEAR	·	2.4 km	MPC · JPL
174829	2003 YT_{66}	—	December 20, 2003	Socorro	LINEAR	·	3.0 km	MPC · JPL
174830	2003 YY_{79}	—	December 18, 2003	Socorro	LINEAR	·	1.6 km	MPC · JPL
174831	2003 YC_{82}	—	December 18, 2003	Socorro	LINEAR	·	1.5 km	MPC · JPL
174832	2003 YV_{82}	—	December 18, 2003	Kitt Peak	Spacewatch	·	2.6 km	MPC · JPL
174833	2003 YW_{83}	—	December 19, 2003	Socorro	LINEAR	MAS	1.1 km	MPC · JPL
174834	2003 YE_{88}	—	December 19, 2003	Socorro	LINEAR	·	2.0 km	MPC · JPL
174835	2003 YQ_{103}	—	December 21, 2003	Socorro	LINEAR	·	2.9 km	MPC · JPL
174836	2003 YP_{105}	—	December 22, 2003	Socorro	LINEAR	·	2.0 km	MPC · JPL
174837	2003 YP_{112}	—	December 23, 2003	Socorro	LINEAR	V	1.3 km	MPC · JPL
174838	2003 YV_{115}	—	December 27, 2003	Kitt Peak	Spacewatch	·	1.8 km	MPC · JPL
174839	2003 YP_{120}	—	December 27, 2003	Socorro	LINEAR	·	2.3 km	MPC · JPL
174840	2003 YO_{129}	—	December 27, 2003	Socorro	LINEAR	·	3.2 km	MPC · JPL
174841	2003 YD_{133}	—	December 28, 2003	Socorro	LINEAR	DOR	5.6 km	MPC · JPL
174842	2003 YJ_{145}	—	December 28, 2003	Socorro	LINEAR	RAF	1.8 km	MPC · JPL
174843	2003 YD_{146}	—	December 28, 2003	Socorro	LINEAR	·	3.7 km	MPC · JPL
174844	2003 YL_{147}	—	December 29, 2003	Socorro	LINEAR	·	2.9 km	MPC · JPL
174845	2003 YC_{149}	—	December 29, 2003	Catalina	CSS	·	4.9 km	MPC · JPL
174846	2003 YE_{153}	—	December 29, 2003	Socorro	LINEAR	·	3.3 km	MPC · JPL
174847	2003 YM_{154}	—	December 29, 2003	Socorro	LINEAR	EUN	2.7 km	MPC · JPL
174848	2003 YH_{155}	—	December 30, 2003	Socorro	LINEAR	EUN	1.8 km	MPC · JPL
174849	2003 YL_{155}	—	December 21, 2003	Socorro	LINEAR	·	2.0 km	MPC · JPL
174850	2003 YT_{155}	—	December 26, 2003	Haleakala	NEAT	ADE	4.4 km	MPC · JPL
174851	2003 YX_{164}	—	December 17, 2003	Kitt Peak	Spacewatch	·	1.7 km	MPC · JPL
174852	2003 YG_{167}	—	December 17, 2003	Kitt Peak	Spacewatch	AGN	1.7 km	MPC · JPL
174853	2003 YS_{168}	—	December 18, 2003	Socorro	LINEAR	·	4.3 km	MPC · JPL
174854	2003 YW_{173}	—	December 19, 2003	Kitt Peak	Spacewatch	V	1.0 km	MPC · JPL
174855	2003 YS_{180}	—	December 30, 2003	Socorro	LINEAR	·	2.6 km	MPC · JPL
174856	2004 AS_{2}	—	January 13, 2004	Anderson Mesa	LONEOS	·	2.4 km	MPC · JPL
174857	2004 AW_{3}	—	January 13, 2004	Anderson Mesa	LONEOS	NYS	2.2 km	MPC · JPL
174858	2004 AM_{4}	—	January 12, 2004	Palomar	NEAT	·	1.9 km	MPC · JPL
174859	2004 AS_{7}	—	January 13, 2004	Anderson Mesa	LONEOS	(5)	1.8 km	MPC · JPL
174860	2004 AC_{8}	—	January 14, 2004	Palomar	NEAT	·	4.6 km	MPC · JPL
174861	2004 AY_{21}	—	January 15, 2004	Kitt Peak	Spacewatch	·	2.2 km	MPC · JPL
174862	2004 BD_{2}	—	January 16, 2004	Palomar	NEAT	·	1.9 km	MPC · JPL
174863	2004 BA_{15}	—	January 16, 2004	Palomar	NEAT	MAS	1.0 km	MPC · JPL
174864	2004 BV_{15}	—	January 17, 2004	Palomar	NEAT	NYS	1.5 km	MPC · JPL
174865	2004 BS_{16}	—	January 16, 2004	Anderson Mesa	LONEOS	·	2.0 km	MPC · JPL
174866	2004 BG_{18}	—	January 18, 2004	Palomar	NEAT	·	2.9 km	MPC · JPL
174867	2004 BZ_{20}	—	January 16, 2004	Kitt Peak	Spacewatch	NYS	1.7 km	MPC · JPL
174868	2004 BH_{25}	—	January 19, 2004	Catalina	CSS	·	3.4 km	MPC · JPL
174869	2004 BX_{38}	—	January 20, 2004	Socorro	LINEAR	·	3.4 km	MPC · JPL
174870	2004 BG_{39}	—	January 21, 2004	Socorro	LINEAR	NYS	1.7 km	MPC · JPL
174871	2004 BE_{42}	—	January 19, 2004	Catalina	CSS	RAF	1.5 km	MPC · JPL
174872	2004 BP_{42}	—	January 19, 2004	Socorro	LINEAR	EUN	2.4 km	MPC · JPL
174873	2004 BL_{43}	—	January 22, 2004	Socorro	LINEAR	·	1.9 km	MPC · JPL
174874	2004 BQ_{47}	—	January 21, 2004	Socorro	LINEAR	EMA	5.9 km	MPC · JPL
174875	2004 BQ_{50}	—	January 21, 2004	Socorro	LINEAR	·	2.3 km	MPC · JPL
174876	2004 BW_{50}	—	January 21, 2004	Socorro	LINEAR	·	1.8 km	MPC · JPL
174877	2004 BU_{52}	—	January 21, 2004	Socorro	LINEAR	NYS	1.9 km	MPC · JPL
174878	2004 BV_{53}	—	January 22, 2004	Socorro	LINEAR	·	2.0 km	MPC · JPL
174879	2004 BP_{54}	—	January 22, 2004	Socorro	LINEAR	·	3.1 km	MPC · JPL
174880	2004 BM_{55}	—	January 22, 2004	Socorro	LINEAR	·	1.8 km	MPC · JPL
174881	2004 BU_{58}	—	January 23, 2004	Socorro	LINEAR	APO +1km	850 m	MPC · JPL
174882	2004 BV_{65}	—	January 22, 2004	Socorro	LINEAR	·	2.6 km	MPC · JPL
174883	2004 BH_{72}	—	January 23, 2004	Socorro	LINEAR	·	2.0 km	MPC · JPL
174884	2004 BC_{74}	—	January 24, 2004	Socorro	LINEAR	·	2.4 km	MPC · JPL
174885	2004 BJ_{76}	—	January 24, 2004	Socorro	LINEAR	·	1.7 km	MPC · JPL
174886	2004 BW_{83}	—	January 23, 2004	Socorro	LINEAR	·	4.1 km	MPC · JPL
174887	2004 BL_{84}	—	January 25, 2004	Haleakala	NEAT	·	3.6 km	MPC · JPL
174888	2004 BP_{89}	—	January 23, 2004	Socorro	LINEAR	·	5.0 km	MPC · JPL
174889	2004 BA_{90}	—	January 23, 2004	Socorro	LINEAR	·	3.1 km	MPC · JPL
174890	2004 BH_{91}	—	January 24, 2004	Socorro	LINEAR	·	3.2 km	MPC · JPL
174891	2004 BJ_{92}	—	January 26, 2004	Anderson Mesa	LONEOS	·	3.2 km	MPC · JPL
174892	2004 BT_{96}	—	January 24, 2004	Socorro	LINEAR	·	1.4 km	MPC · JPL
174893	2004 BW_{101}	—	January 29, 2004	Socorro	LINEAR	·	2.5 km	MPC · JPL
174894	2004 BM_{102}	—	January 29, 2004	Kitt Peak	Spacewatch	·	3.8 km	MPC · JPL
174895	2004 BS_{104}	—	January 23, 2004	Socorro	LINEAR	·	2.1 km	MPC · JPL
174896	2004 BT_{106}	—	January 26, 2004	Anderson Mesa	LONEOS	EUN	1.5 km	MPC · JPL
174897	2004 BF_{109}	—	January 28, 2004	Catalina	CSS	·	2.3 km	MPC · JPL
174898	2004 BL_{111}	—	January 29, 2004	Catalina	CSS	·	5.8 km	MPC · JPL
174899	2004 BT_{113}	—	January 28, 2004	Kitt Peak	Spacewatch	·	2.2 km	MPC · JPL
174900	2004 BL_{117}	—	January 28, 2004	Catalina	CSS	·	2.5 km	MPC · JPL

== 174901–175000 ==
back to top

Designation			Discovery			Properties		Ref
Permanent	Provisional	Named after	Date	Site	Discoverer(s)	Category	Diam.	Ref
174901	2004 BE_{118}	—	January 29, 2004	Socorro	LINEAR	·	2.2 km	MPC · JPL
174902	2004 BO_{118}	—	January 29, 2004	Catalina	CSS	·	2.0 km	MPC · JPL
174903	2004 BL_{119}	—	January 30, 2004	Kitt Peak	Spacewatch	MIS	3.6 km	MPC · JPL
174904	2004 BP_{122}	—	January 18, 2004	Kitt Peak	Spacewatch	·	1.6 km	MPC · JPL
174905	2004 BJ_{127}	—	January 16, 2004	Kitt Peak	Spacewatch	·	1.7 km	MPC · JPL
174906	2004 BS_{127}	—	January 16, 2004	Kitt Peak	Spacewatch	·	1.6 km	MPC · JPL
174907	2004 BS_{133}	—	January 18, 2004	Kitt Peak	Spacewatch	SUL	3.5 km	MPC · JPL
174908	2004 BP_{134}	—	January 18, 2004	Palomar	NEAT	·	3.0 km	MPC · JPL
174909	2004 BE_{147}	—	January 22, 2004	Socorro	LINEAR	·	3.1 km	MPC · JPL
174910	2004 BO_{151}	—	January 18, 2004	Palomar	NEAT	·	2.4 km	MPC · JPL
174911	2004 BG_{153}	—	January 27, 2004	Kitt Peak	Spacewatch	·	1.8 km	MPC · JPL
174912	2004 BD_{155}	—	January 28, 2004	Kitt Peak	Spacewatch	(5)	1.5 km	MPC · JPL
174913	2004 BM_{156}	—	January 28, 2004	Kitt Peak	Spacewatch	·	2.2 km	MPC · JPL
174914	2004 CP_{1}	—	February 11, 2004	Desert Eagle	W. K. Y. Yeung	·	4.6 km	MPC · JPL
174915	2004 CQ_{1}	—	February 11, 2004	Desert Eagle	W. K. Y. Yeung	·	2.1 km	MPC · JPL
174916	2004 CG_{4}	—	February 10, 2004	Palomar	NEAT	·	2.3 km	MPC · JPL
174917	2004 CN_{6}	—	February 10, 2004	Palomar	NEAT	·	2.6 km	MPC · JPL
174918	2004 CJ_{13}	—	February 11, 2004	Palomar	NEAT	·	1.9 km	MPC · JPL
174919	2004 CV_{20}	—	February 11, 2004	Kitt Peak	Spacewatch	·	1.2 km	MPC · JPL
174920	2004 CE_{22}	—	February 11, 2004	Palomar	NEAT	·	2.1 km	MPC · JPL
174921	2004 CJ_{22}	—	February 11, 2004	Palomar	NEAT	·	1.8 km	MPC · JPL
174922	2004 CB_{28}	—	February 12, 2004	Kitt Peak	Spacewatch	·	1.5 km	MPC · JPL
174923	2004 CF_{33}	—	February 12, 2004	Kitt Peak	Spacewatch	(5)	1.4 km	MPC · JPL
174924	2004 CO_{33}	—	February 12, 2004	Kitt Peak	Spacewatch	·	2.0 km	MPC · JPL
174925	2004 CE_{36}	—	February 11, 2004	Palomar	NEAT	·	3.1 km	MPC · JPL
174926	2004 CJ_{37}	—	February 12, 2004	Kitt Peak	Spacewatch	·	3.3 km	MPC · JPL
174927	2004 CX_{37}	—	February 13, 2004	Palomar	NEAT	·	2.0 km	MPC · JPL
174928	2004 CM_{45}	—	February 13, 2004	Kitt Peak	Spacewatch	·	3.3 km	MPC · JPL
174929	2004 CZ_{50}	—	February 14, 2004	Kitt Peak	Spacewatch	·	2.5 km	MPC · JPL
174930	2004 CP_{52}	—	February 11, 2004	Anderson Mesa	LONEOS	·	4.7 km	MPC · JPL
174931	2004 CV_{54}	—	February 11, 2004	Palomar	NEAT	·	1.7 km	MPC · JPL
174932	2004 CC_{59}	—	February 10, 2004	Palomar	NEAT	·	1.5 km	MPC · JPL
174933	2004 CE_{61}	—	February 11, 2004	Kitt Peak	Spacewatch	·	3.6 km	MPC · JPL
174934	2004 CP_{62}	—	February 11, 2004	Palomar	NEAT	·	2.0 km	MPC · JPL
174935	2004 CT_{62}	—	February 11, 2004	Palomar	NEAT	·	5.3 km	MPC · JPL
174936	2004 CU_{62}	—	February 11, 2004	Palomar	NEAT	·	3.4 km	MPC · JPL
174937	2004 CP_{64}	—	February 13, 2004	Kitt Peak	Spacewatch	·	1.7 km	MPC · JPL
174938	2004 CM_{65}	—	February 14, 2004	Haleakala	NEAT	·	3.9 km	MPC · JPL
174939	2004 CW_{68}	—	February 11, 2004	Anderson Mesa	LONEOS	·	2.8 km	MPC · JPL
174940	2004 CE_{70}	—	February 11, 2004	Palomar	NEAT	·	3.5 km	MPC · JPL
174941	2004 CL_{70}	—	February 12, 2004	Kitt Peak	Spacewatch	·	1.8 km	MPC · JPL
174942	2004 CS_{75}	—	February 11, 2004	Palomar	NEAT	·	1.5 km	MPC · JPL
174943	2004 CN_{79}	—	February 11, 2004	Palomar	NEAT	·	2.4 km	MPC · JPL
174944	2004 CH_{80}	—	February 11, 2004	Palomar	NEAT	AGN	2.1 km	MPC · JPL
174945	2004 CX_{82}	—	February 12, 2004	Kitt Peak	Spacewatch	·	3.8 km	MPC · JPL
174946	2004 CF_{85}	—	February 14, 2004	Haleakala	NEAT	·	5.8 km	MPC · JPL
174947	2004 CR_{85}	—	February 14, 2004	Kitt Peak	Spacewatch	·	3.3 km	MPC · JPL
174948	2004 CZ_{89}	—	February 12, 2004	Kitt Peak	Spacewatch	·	2.2 km	MPC · JPL
174949	2004 CB_{99}	—	February 14, 2004	Catalina	CSS	·	3.7 km	MPC · JPL
174950	2004 CS_{104}	—	February 13, 2004	Palomar	NEAT	·	2.7 km	MPC · JPL
174951	2004 CG_{107}	—	February 14, 2004	Catalina	CSS	·	2.3 km	MPC · JPL
174952	2004 CN_{109}	—	February 11, 2004	Socorro	LINEAR	EUN	2.3 km	MPC · JPL
174953	2004 CR_{109}	—	February 11, 2004	Socorro	LINEAR	·	2.8 km	MPC · JPL
174954	2004 CB_{113}	—	February 13, 2004	Anderson Mesa	LONEOS	(5)	1.7 km	MPC · JPL
174955	2004 CP_{116}	—	February 11, 2004	Kitt Peak	Spacewatch	·	2.2 km	MPC · JPL
174956	2004 CQ_{126}	—	February 12, 2004	Kitt Peak	Spacewatch	·	2.2 km	MPC · JPL
174957	2004 CJ_{129}	—	February 14, 2004	Kitt Peak	Spacewatch	·	2.5 km	MPC · JPL
174958	2004 CS_{130}	—	February 12, 2004	Palomar	NEAT	·	2.3 km	MPC · JPL
174959	2004 DB_{2}	—	February 17, 2004	Socorro	LINEAR	·	3.3 km	MPC · JPL
174960	2004 DK_{3}	—	February 16, 2004	Kitt Peak	Spacewatch	·	2.4 km	MPC · JPL
174961	2004 DJ_{4}	—	February 16, 2004	Socorro	LINEAR	·	5.3 km	MPC · JPL
174962	2004 DP_{4}	—	February 16, 2004	Kitt Peak	Spacewatch	AGN	1.9 km	MPC · JPL
174963	2004 DJ_{7}	—	February 17, 2004	Kitt Peak	Spacewatch	·	2.3 km	MPC · JPL
174964	2004 DN_{14}	—	February 16, 2004	Catalina	CSS	·	4.9 km	MPC · JPL
174965	2004 DH_{16}	—	February 17, 2004	Kitt Peak	Spacewatch	·	3.6 km	MPC · JPL
174966	2004 DN_{17}	—	February 18, 2004	Kitt Peak	Spacewatch	·	2.6 km	MPC · JPL
174967	2004 DD_{19}	—	February 16, 2004	Socorro	LINEAR	·	2.3 km	MPC · JPL
174968	2004 DA_{29}	—	February 17, 2004	Kitt Peak	Spacewatch	·	2.1 km	MPC · JPL
174969	2004 DT_{29}	—	February 17, 2004	Socorro	LINEAR	·	1.6 km	MPC · JPL
174970	2004 DK_{30}	—	February 17, 2004	Socorro	LINEAR	·	2.0 km	MPC · JPL
174971	2004 DA_{34}	—	February 18, 2004	Kitt Peak	Spacewatch	·	3.2 km	MPC · JPL
174972	2004 DE_{34}	—	February 18, 2004	Catalina	CSS	·	2.3 km	MPC · JPL
174973	2004 DO_{38}	—	February 20, 2004	Haleakala	NEAT	·	1.9 km	MPC · JPL
174974	2004 DB_{43}	—	February 23, 2004	Socorro	LINEAR	(29841)	2.3 km	MPC · JPL
174975	2004 DP_{44}	—	February 17, 2004	Kitt Peak	Spacewatch	AGN	1.6 km	MPC · JPL
174976	2004 DA_{46}	—	February 19, 2004	Socorro	LINEAR	slow	2.5 km	MPC · JPL
174977	2004 DT_{49}	—	February 20, 2004	Haleakala	NEAT	·	3.0 km	MPC · JPL
174978	2004 DZ_{50}	—	February 23, 2004	Socorro	LINEAR	·	1.3 km	MPC · JPL
174979	2004 DP_{52}	—	February 25, 2004	Socorro	LINEAR	·	2.3 km	MPC · JPL
174980	2004 DG_{58}	—	February 23, 2004	Socorro	LINEAR	·	2.0 km	MPC · JPL
174981	2004 DO_{60}	—	February 26, 2004	Socorro	LINEAR	·	2.0 km	MPC · JPL
174982	2004 DY_{74}	—	February 17, 2004	Kitt Peak	Spacewatch	·	2.3 km	MPC · JPL
174983	2004 EK_{2}	—	March 12, 2004	Palomar	NEAT	·	2.5 km	MPC · JPL
174984	2004 EE_{5}	—	March 11, 2004	Palomar	NEAT	·	2.6 km	MPC · JPL
174985	2004 EV_{5}	—	March 11, 2004	Palomar	NEAT	·	3.4 km	MPC · JPL
174986	2004 EV_{6}	—	March 12, 2004	Palomar	NEAT	·	3.7 km	MPC · JPL
174987	2004 EK_{8}	—	March 13, 2004	Palomar	NEAT	·	3.4 km	MPC · JPL
174988	2004 EU_{13}	—	March 11, 2004	Palomar	NEAT	·	2.4 km	MPC · JPL
174989	2004 ET_{17}	—	March 12, 2004	Palomar	NEAT	CLO	3.2 km	MPC · JPL
174990	2004 EB_{20}	—	March 14, 2004	Kitt Peak	Spacewatch	·	3.5 km	MPC · JPL
174991	2004 EW_{28}	—	March 15, 2004	Kitt Peak	Spacewatch	·	1.5 km	MPC · JPL
174992	2004 EU_{33}	—	March 11, 2004	Palomar	NEAT	WIT	1.7 km	MPC · JPL
174993	2004 ED_{35}	—	March 12, 2004	Palomar	NEAT	·	2.1 km	MPC · JPL
174994	2004 EW_{35}	—	March 13, 2004	Palomar	NEAT	·	2.8 km	MPC · JPL
174995	2004 EM_{39}	—	March 15, 2004	Kitt Peak	Spacewatch	·	2.3 km	MPC · JPL
174996	2004 EF_{58}	—	March 15, 2004	Catalina	CSS	·	2.5 km	MPC · JPL
174997	2004 EH_{58}	—	March 15, 2004	Catalina	CSS	·	2.2 km	MPC · JPL
174998	2004 EF_{62}	—	March 12, 2004	Palomar	NEAT	AGN	1.7 km	MPC · JPL
174999	2004 EZ_{62}	—	March 13, 2004	Palomar	NEAT	·	2.9 km	MPC · JPL
175000	2004 ED_{64}	—	March 14, 2004	Socorro	LINEAR	GEF	2.7 km	MPC · JPL

back to top

== See also ==
- Meanings of minor-planet names: 174001–175000
