= Euphorbus =

Greek mythological figure in the Iliad

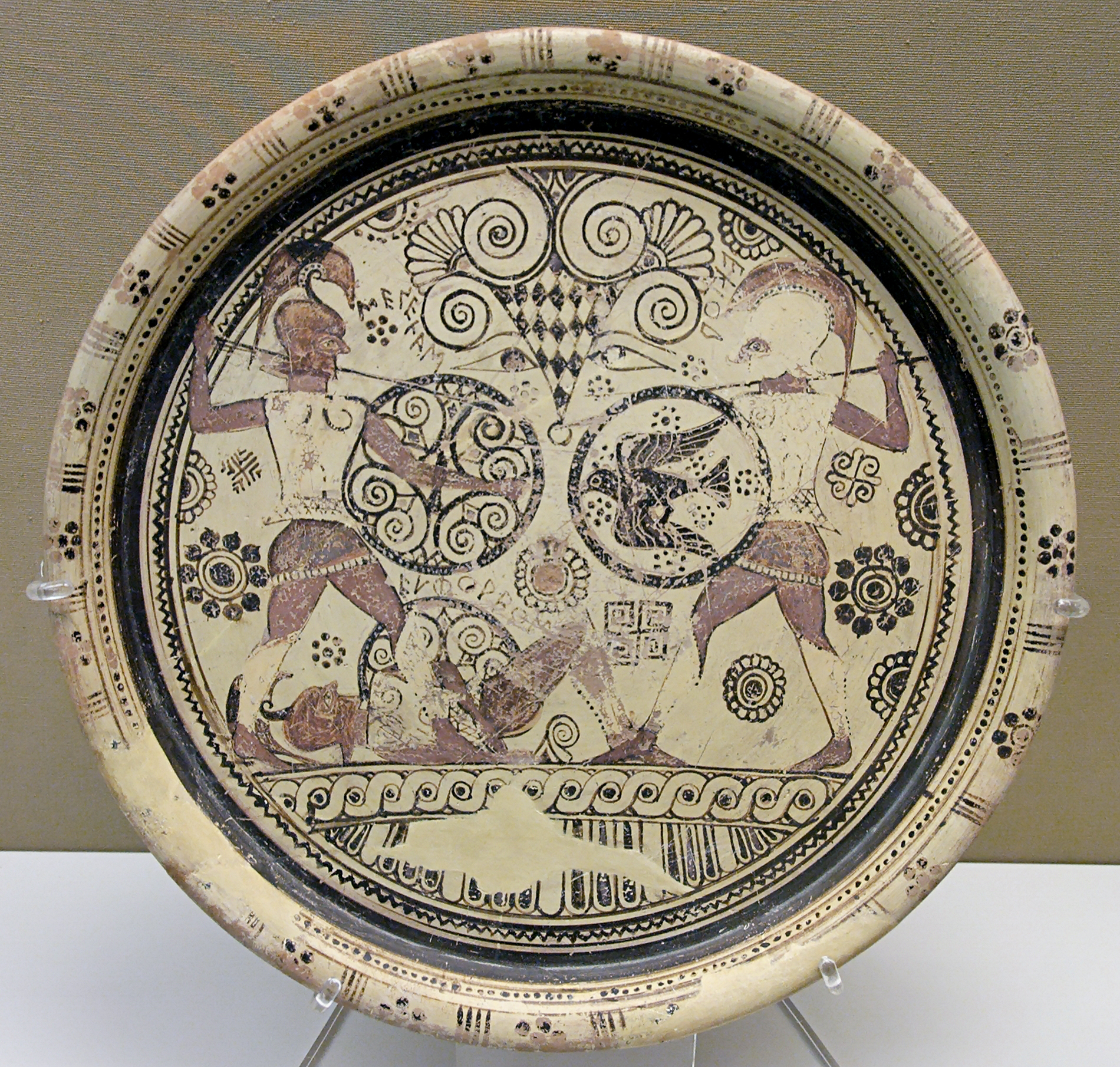
Menelaus and Hector fighting over the body of Euphorbus, on the Euphorbos plate, from Rhodes, Middle Wild Goat style, c. 600 BCE, British Museum.

In Greek mythology, Euphorbus (Ancient Greek: Εὔφορβος Euphorbos) was a Trojan hero during the Trojan War.

== Description ==
John Tzetzes describes Euphorbus as handsome man with 'the loveliest locks among the curly-haired', into which with gold and other ornaments were braided. Homer describes his hair as like that of the Charites, and as being bound with gold and silver.

== Family ==
In the Iliad Euphorbus is described as the son of Panthous and Phrontis, and thus also brother to Polydamas and Hyperenor. In his Chiliades or Book of Histories, Tzetzes relays that Orpheus gives Euphorbus' parents as the naiad Abarbarea and Boucolides.

== Mythology ==
In the Iliad Euphorbus wounded Patroclus before the Achaean hero was killed by Hector, and was then killed by Menelaus in the fight for Patroclus' body. Tzetzes relates that Euphorbus was the second to strike Patroclus with the god Apollo being the first.

In Homer's account Menelaus is prevented from taking Euphorbus' armour through the actions of Apollo, who, in disguise, drew Hector's attention to Euphorbus' death. but other sources claim that the shield was taken by Menelaus who dedicated it as an offering in a temple. According to Pausanias this was the temple of Hera in Argos, though Diogenes Laërtius claimed it was the temple of Apollo at Didyma.

== Reincarnation ==
Several sources from the 4th Century BCE onwards relate a tradition in which Euphorbus was the subject of reincarnation. These accounts often includes a story of someone who claimed that they used to be Euphorbus travelling to a temple and identifying an offering within as the shield that Euphorbus had used at Troy. Several versions also assert that the 6th century BCE philosopher Pythagoras claimed to be a reincarnation of Euphorbus.

The Roman author and grammarian Aulus Gellius states that it was well known that Pythagoras claimed to have been a reincarnation of Euphorbus and adds that Dicaearchus and Clearchus give further details of the chain of reincarnations claimed by Pythagoras. The Greek sophist Philostratus also includes the story of Pythagoras' claim in his Life of Apollonius of Tyana.

The poet Ovid includes both the details of verification via shield and the later reincarnation as Pythagoras in his epic poem Metamorphoses. The 3rd century CE biographer Diogenes Laërtius reports this story in his Lives and Opinions of Eminent Philosophers, giving as a source the Greek philosopher Heraclides of Pontus. In this account Pythagoras claimed that Euphorbus was one reincarnation in a string of previous lives which began with the Argonaut Aethalides. Aethalides' father, Hermes, offered to grant him any wish except for immortality, and Aethalides therefore chose to be able to remember, even in death, everything that had happened to him. In this variant of the story after Aethalides had lived as Euphorbus he became Hermotimus, who, wishing to prove that he had previously been Euphorbus, travelled to the Temple of Apollo at Didyma, and pointed out the shield of Euphorbus which had been dedicated there by Menelaus.

Although Heraclides is the earliest surviving source for the Pythagorean tradition, Walter Burkert suggests that the fact that the story is also known to Dicaearchus suggests that the tradition predates Heraclides, but nonetheless credits Heraclides with combining different independent traditions of euphorbian reincarnations.

== See also ==
- 4063 Euforbo, Jovian asteroid
- List of mortals in Greek mythology
