= Phrontis =

In Greek mythology, Phrontis (/fron-tis/; Ancient Greek: Φροντίς, romanized: Phrontís, lit. 'thought, care, attention') may refer to the following personages:

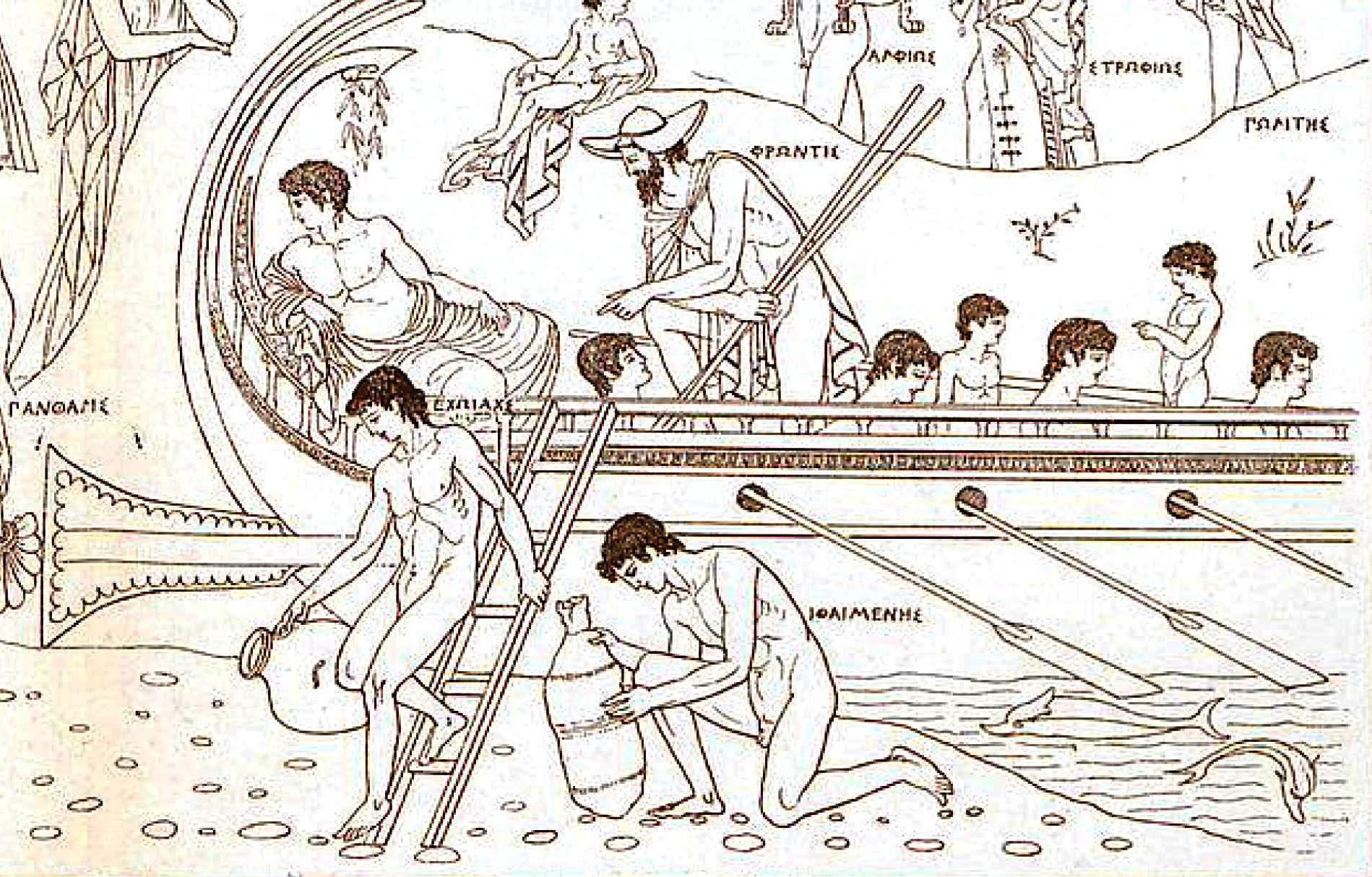
Detail form Reconstruction of Iliupersis by Polygnotus

Male

- Phrontis, son of Phrixus and Chalciope, daughter of King Aeetes.
- Phrontis, son of Onetor and the steersman in Menelaus' vessel. Phrontis had an excellent reputation in his craft but came to his end when he was rounding Sunium in Attica. The god Apollo shot him dead. Menelaus stopped at the cape to build Phrontis a tomb and pay him the due rites of burial.

Female

- Phrontis, wife of Panthous, one of the Elders of Troy, and mother of Euphorbus, Hyperenor and Polydamas.
