= Ilioneus =

Several figures in Greek mythology

In Greek mythology, the name Ilioneus (Ancient Greek: Ἰλιονεύς Īlioneus) may refer to:

- Ilioneus, one of the Niobids.
- Ilioneus, a Trojan elder, who implored Diomedes to spare him, but was killed nevertheless.
- Ilioneus, a Trojan prince as the illegitimate son of King Priam of Troy by an unknown woman. When Paris, his brother, came to Troy for the first time, he defeated Ilioneus and Deiphobus, among others, in a variety of competitions. He and his brother Philenor were killed by Ajax, the son of Oileus, during the war.
- Ilioneus, a Trojan, only son of Phorbas, was killed by Peneleos.
- Ilioneus, a companion of Aeneas. He was one of those whose ships sank during the storm in which Aeneas and his people were caught. Being the eldest of the Trojan survivors with Aeneas, he was the first to speak to Dido when they entered her palace at Carthage.

== See also ==
- 5130 Ilioneus, Jovian asteroid
