= Polydamas (mythology) =

Lieutenant during the Trojan War

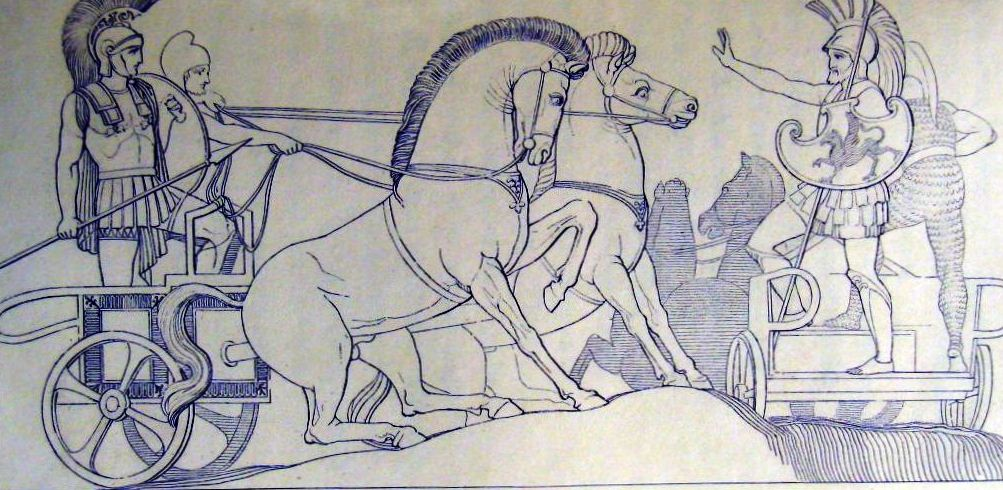
Polydamas attempting to stop Hector attacking the Greeks, from John Flaxman's illustrations to The Iliad

In Greek mythology, Polydamas (/pəˈlɪdəməs/; Ancient Greek: Ancient Greek: Πολυδάμας, gen. Πολυδάμαντος, romanized: Polydámas or Polydámantos, lit. 'ruler of many' or 'subduer of many') was a lieutenant and friend of Hector during the Trojan War.

== Family ==
Polydamas was the son of Panthous, one of the Trojan elders and Phrontis. He was the father of Leocritus who was killed by Odysseus. Alternatively, he has been given as the son of the Trojan elder Antenor and his wife Theano.

In at least one non-classical account, his wife was given as Lycaste, a bastard daughter of Priam.

== Mythology ==
During the battles described in the Iliad, he often proposes a cautious battle strategy which is sometimes accepted but more often refused by Hector, who prefers direct attack. In Book XII, he prefers retreat in the face of the omen of an eagle. Hector defies this and presses forth anyway. However, Hector does take his advice to regroup in Book XIII, after the Argives have done tremendous damage to the Trojans. In Book XVIII of the Iliad, Polydamas advises the Trojans to retire from the battlefield after the death of Patroclus. Hector, however, overrules Polydamas, leaving the army in the field when Achilles ends his feud with Agamemnon and rejoins the Achaean forces. As a result, Achilles kills a great number of Trojan warriors, culminating in a duel with Hector in which the latter is killed.

Polydamas appears periodically throughout the battles, and brags about killing Prothoënor. He often complements Hector in battle. In Book XV, after killing Mecistus and Otus, he is attacked by Meges, but Apollo saves him, causing him to dodge at the last moment. Polydamas killed three Greeks in the war.

Homer gives no foreshadowing of Polydamas's final fate, nor is he mentioned in most of the later poems dealing with the aftermath of the war, leaving the reader to infer that he perished in the general slaughter after the fall of Troy to the Greek forces.

He is mentioned in Quintus Smyrnaeus' Posthomerica, but again, no death is mentioned. In Quintus Smyrneaus' story, Polydamas actually suggests that instead of attacking or fleeing, the Trojans should just give Helen back to the Greeks. This suggestion is well received by many soldiers, but nobody admits it. Paris calls him a deserter and a coward, but Polydamas retorts that Paris' ambitions instigated the problem. Later on, he tries again to persuade the Trojans to stay inside the city in order to raise troop morale, but it is Aeneas that opposes his opinion this time, on the grounds that the Greeks will not be disheartened by a long stay inside the walls.

According to Dictys Cretensis, a warrior named Polydamas was killed by Ajax the Greater in the battle around Memnon's body, though later Byzantine sources interpret this Polydamas as a separate character, an eastern king and companion of Memnon.

One tradition holds him as surviving the war and accompanying Antenor, Theano, and Helicaon after the fall of Troy. With a group of Trojans and leaderless Eneti, they came to Italy and defeated the Euganei of King Velesus before founding the city of Padua. In the Roman epic poem Punica, the Roman warrior Pedianus, a descendant of Antenor, goes into battle wearing the armor of Polydamas.

== Eponym ==
- 4348 Poulydamas - an asteroid named after Polydamas
