= Panthous =

Character in Greek mythology

In Greek mythology, Panthous (Ancient Greek: Πάνθοος), son of Othrys, was an elder of Troy, husband of the "queenly" Phrontis and father of Euphorbus, Polydamas and Hyperenor. Alternatively, his wife was sometimes said to be Pronome, a daughter of Clytius, Priam's brother.

Because he was the son of Othrys, he had the patronymic Othryades (Ancient Greek: Ὀθρυάδης).

== Mythology ==
Panthous was originally a priest of Apollo at Delphi. When Priam, after Troy had been destroyed by Heracles, sent a son of Antenor to Delphi to inquire whether it was appropriate to build a new citadel on the foundations of the destroyed city, said son of Antenor was charmed by Panthous' beauty and carried him off. Panthous, in accord with Priam' s will, continued to perform his duties as a priest of Apollo at Troy.

Panthous was credited with killing four Greeks in the Trojan War. In the Aeneid, Panthous is portrayed lamenting his own and Troy's fate on the night of the city's fall, with his baby grandson in his arms. He is further killed by one of the Greeks.

Alongside the other Trojan elders, there was a statue of him in Thebes, Egypt.
