= Ennomos family =

The Ennomos family (009) is a small collisional asteroid family of at least 28 known asteroids, named for its largest member, the 81-kilometre (50 mi)-across asteroid 4709 Ennomos. It lies within the larger dynamical group of Jupiter trojans, a group of asteroids in an orbital resonance with Jupiter such that they stay about 60 degrees ahead of/behind the planet in its orbit at all times in the Lagrange points L4 and L5, with the Ennomos family being part of the trailing cloud around L5, also known as the Trojan camp. All members of the family are dark (assumed to be C-type asteroids) with albedos of around 0.09.

An asteroid family is a group of physically related asteroids usually created by a collision with an original larger asteroid, with the fragments continuing on similar orbits to the original. This is distinct from a dynamical group in that the members of a dynamical group only share similar orbits because of gravitational interactions with planets, which concentrate asteroids in a particular orbital range. Members of the Ennomos family are both part of the wider Trojan dynamical group, and fragments of 4709 Ennomos. The family is considered a non-catastrophic asteroid family because 4709 Ennomos, its largest member, makes up a majority of the family's total mass, rather than simply being the largest of a number of fragments each making up a small fraction of the original destroyed asteroid.

The trojan 1867 Deiphobus is a large interloper in the family's orbital region. A 2024 study found Deiphobus to have its own overlapping family to the Ennomos family, albeit with a slightly higher inclination. As a result, some of the members included as part of the Ennomos family may actually belong to the Deiphobus family and vice versa.

== Large members ==

- 4709 Ennomos: 5.8 (75.1%)
- 17492 Hippasos: 0.815 (10.6%)
- (76867) 2000 YM5: 0.463 (6.0%)
- (55419) 2001 TF19: 0.162 (2.1%)
- (36624) 2000 QA157: 0.0906 (1.2%)
- 48373 Gorgythion: 0.0454 (0.6%)
- (98362) 2000 SA363: 0.0284 (0.4%)
- (131451) 2001 QD174: 0.0251 (0.3%)
- (77894) 2001 SY263: 0.0241 (0.3%)
- (247967) 2003 YD149: 0.0241 (0.3%)
- all other members: 0.242 (3.1%)
Mass distribution of the Ennomos family (assuming similar densities)

The 10 brightest Ennomos family members
Name	Abs. Mag	Size (km)	proper a (AU)	proper e	proper i
4709 Ennomos	8.66	81	5.2965	0.032	26.825
17492 Hippasos	10.08	54	5.3316	0.028	27.611
(76867) 2000 YM5	10.49	43	5.2616	0.027	28.136
(55419) 2001 TF19	11.25	31	5.3069	0.038	27.498
(36624) 2000 QA157	11.67	32	5.2851	0.027	27.377
48373 Gorgythion	12.17	20	5.3347	0.038	27.786
(98362) 2000 SA363	12.51	14	5.3308	0.034	27.114
(131451) 2001 QD174	12.60	21	5.3210	0.041	27.276
(77894) 2001 SY263	12.63	20	5.2996	0.034	27.868
(247967) 2003 YD149	12.63	21	5.2841	0.029	28.044
