= 192 Nausikaa =

Main-belt asteroid

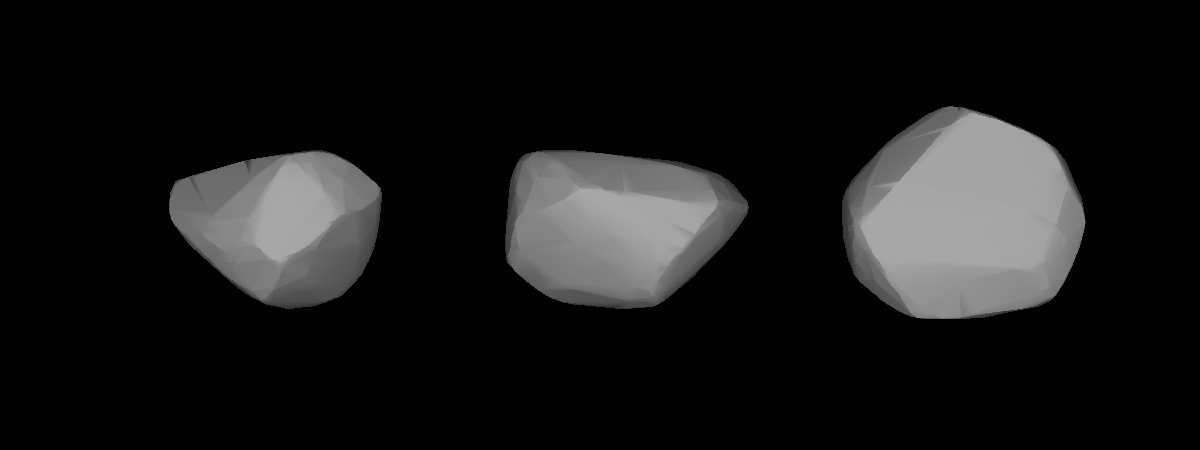
- A three-dimensional model of 192 Nausikaa based on its lightcurve

Discovery
- Discovered by: J. Palisa, 1879
- Discovery date: 17 February 1879

Designations
- Pronunciation: /nɔːˈsɪki.ə/
- Named after: Nausicaä
- Alternative designations: A879 DA; 1933 HH
- Minor planet category: Main belt
- Adjectives: Nausikaan

Orbital characteristics
- Epoch 31 July 2016 (JD 2457600.5)
- Uncertainty parameter 0
- Observation arc: 137.04 yr (50054 d)
- Aphelion: 2.9934 AU (447.81 Gm)
- Perihelion: 1.8121 AU (271.09 Gm)
- Semi-major axis: 2.4028 AU (359.45 Gm)
- Eccentricity: 0.24582
- Orbital period (sidereal): 3.72 yr (1360.4 d)
- Mean anomaly: 94.342°
- Mean motion: 0° 15^{m} 52.632^{s} / day
- Inclination: 6.8137°
- Longitude of ascending node: 343.25°
- Argument of perihelion: 30.067°
- Earth MOID: 0.814558 AU (121.8561 Gm)
- Jupiter MOID: 2.48275 AU (371.414 Gm)
- T_{Jupiter}: 3.474

Physical characteristics
- Dimensions: 103.26±1.9 km 90.18 ± 2.80 km (composite estimate)
- Mass: (1.79 ± 0.42) × 10^{18} kg (composite estimate) (8.1±1.6)×10^{17} kg (Note: Calculated from its standard gravitational parameter GM = 0.054±0.011 km^{3}/s^{2}.)
- Mean density: 4.64 ± 1.17 g/cm^{3} 1.60 g/cm^{3} (Note: Assuming a diameter of 98.8 km.)
- Synodic rotation period: 13.625 h (0.5677 d)
- Geometric albedo: 0.2330±0.009
- Spectral type: S
- Apparent magnitude: 8.2
- Absolute magnitude (H): 7.13

192 Nausikaa (Note: Stressed on the 'i', /nɔːˈsɪkiə/.) is a large main-belt S-type asteroid. It was discovered by Johann Palisa on February 17, 1879, at Pula, then in Austria, now in Croatia. The name derives from Nausicaä, a princess in Homer's Odyssey.

This is an S-type asteroid around 86 km with an elliptical ratio of 1.51. The sidereal rotation period is 13.6217 hours.

Based on the lightcurve data obtained from Nausikaa, a possible satellite was reported in 1985. However, this has not been confirmed. A shape model of Nausikaa has been constructed, also based on the lightcurve data. It indicates a roughly cut, but not very elongated body. In 1998 an occultation of a star by the asteroid was observed from the United States.

In 1988 a search for satellites or dust orbiting this asteroid was performed using the UH88 telescope at the Mauna Kea Observatories, but the effort came up empty.

Nausikaa's orbital period is 3.72 years, its distance from the Sun varying between 1.81 and 2.99 AU. The orbital eccentricity is 0.246. Nausikaa brightened to magnitude 8.3 at a quite favorable opposition on 2 September 2011, when it was 1.875 AU from the Sun and 0.866 AU from the Earth.
