= Arkesilaos family =

The Arkesilaos family (008) is a small collisional asteroid family of at least 37 known asteroids, named for its largest member, the 22-kilometre (14 mi)-across asteroid 20961 Arkesilaos. It lies within the larger dynamical group of Jupiter trojans, a group of asteroids in an orbital resonance with Jupiter such that they stay about 60 degrees ahead of/behind the planet in its orbit at all times in the Lagrange points L4 and L5, with the Arkesilaos family being part of the leading cloud around L4, also known as the Greek camp. All members of the family are dark (assumed to be C-type asteroids) with albedos of around 0.06.

An asteroid family is a group of physically related asteroids usually created by a collision with an original larger asteroid, with the fragments continuing on similar orbits to the original. This is distinct from a dynamical group in that the members of a dynamical group only share similar orbits because of gravitational interactions with planets, which concentrate asteroids in a particular orbital range. Members of the Arkesilaos family are both part of the wider Trojan dynamical group, and fragments of 20961 Arkesilaos. The family is considered a catastrophic asteroid family because 20961 Arkesilaos, its largest member, makes up only a fifth of the family's mass.

== Large members ==

- 20961 Arkesilaos: 0.113 (22.8%)
- (189772) 2002 CQ78: 0.0349 (7.1%)
- (241573) 1995 QE9: 0.028 (5.7%)
- (202791) 2008 QC4: 0.0228 (4.6%)
- (263802) 2008 RG19: 0.0183 (3.7%)
- (296745) 2009 TL46: 0.0161 (3.3%)
- (257566) 1998 WP37: 0.0153 (3.1%)
- (353359) 2010 WN60: 0.015 (3.0%)
- (310668) 2002 EQ140: 0.0133 (2.7%)
- (264110) 2009 SL339: 0.0131 (2.6%)
- all other members: 0.205 (41.4%)
Mass distribution of the Arkesilaos family (assuming similar densities)

The 10 brightest Arkesilaos family members
Name	Abs. Mag	Size (km)	proper a (AU)	proper e	proper i
20961 Arkesilaos	11.95	22	5.2758	0.029	8.890
(189772) 2002 CQ78	12.80	15	5.2891	0.027	8.847
(241573) 1995 QE9	12.96	14	5.2424	0.033	9.032
(202791) 2008 QC4	13.11	13	5.2437	0.031	8.970
(263802) 2008 RG19	13.27	13	5.2354	0.029	8.518
(296745) 2009 TL46	13.36	13	5.2457	0.031	8.865
(257566) 1998 WP37	13.40	11	5.2397	0.039	8.816
(353359) 2010 WN60	13.41	11	5.2389	0.030	8.613
(310668) 2002 EQ140	13.50	11	5.2719	0.040	8.724
(264110) 2009 SL339	13.51	11	5.2492	0.030	8.939
