= P/2013 R3 (Catalina–PanSTARRS) =

Disintegrated active main-belt asteroid

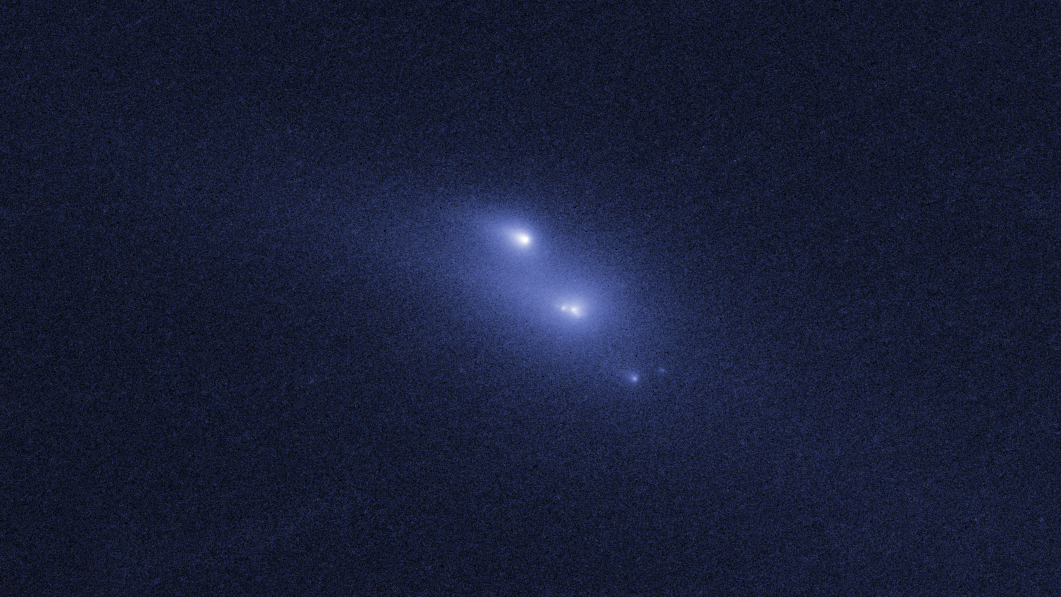
- Hubble image of P/2013 R3 disintegrating into multiple fragments on 29 October 2013

Discovery
- Discovered by: R. E. Hill (Catalina Sky Survey); B. Bolin et al. (Pan-STARRS 1)
- Discovery site: Catalina Station; Haleakalā Observatory
- Discovery date: 15 September 2013

Designations
- Alternative designations: P/2013 R3

Orbital characteristics
- Epoch: 13 October 2013 (JD 2456578.5)
- Observation arc: 124 days
- Earliest precovery date: 1 September 2013
- Orbit type: main-belt (outer) · Encke-type · periodic
- Aphelion: 3.862 AU
- Perihelion: 2.204 AU
- Semi-major axis: 3.033 AU
- Eccentricity: 0.2734
- Orbital period: 5.28 yr (1,929 days)
- Inclination: 0.899°
- Longitude of ascending node: 342.684°
- Argument of periapsis: 8.238°
- Last perihelion: 5 August 2013
- T_{Jupiter}: 3.184
- Earth MOID: 1.197 AU
- Jupiter MOID: 1.572 AU

Physical characteristics
- Mean diameter: ~800 m (precursor); ~400 m (largest fragment)
- Geometric albedo: 0.05 (assumed)
- Spectral type: C B–V = 0.66±0.04; V–R = 0.38±0.03; R–I = 0.36±0.03
- Comet total magnitude (M1): 7.2±1.0
- Comet nuclear magnitude (M2): >23.5 (post-disintegration); 16.0±0.9
- Apparent magnitude: >28 (post-disintegration)

P/2013 R3 (Catalina–PanSTARRS) was an active main-belt asteroid that disintegrated from 2013 to 2014 due to the centrifugal breakup of its rapidly-rotating nucleus. It was discovered by astronomers of the Catalina and Pan-STARRS sky surveys on 15 September 2013. The disintegration of this asteroid ejected numerous fragments and dusty debris into space, which temporarily gave it a diffuse, comet-like appearance with a dust tail blown back by solar radiation pressure. Observations by ground-based telescopes in October 2013 revealed that P/2013 R3 had broken up into four major components, with later Hubble Space Telescope observations showing that these components have further broken up into at least thirteen smaller fragments ranging 100–400 meters (330–1,310 ft) in diameter. P/2013 R3 was never seen again after February 2014.

P/2013 R3 was originally an 800-meter (2,600 ft)-diameter carbonaceous C-type asteroid that gradually spun up due to continuous torquing by sunlight reflecting off its irregular surface, a phenomenon known as the YORP effect. The asteroid likely reached a rotation period shorter than 2 hours before it began breaking apart, which suggests it had a weakly-bound rubble pile internal structure resembling those of asteroids Bennu and Ryugu. It likely began disintegrating sometime in August 2013, one month before it was discovered.

== Discovery ==
P/2013 R3 was first detected on 15 September 2013 09:06 UTC by astronomer Richard E. Hill at Catalina Station, Arizona, during routine observations for the Catalina Sky Survey using its 0.68-m Schmidt telescope. Hill did not report on the object's appearance. Concurrent survey observations by the 1.8-m Pan-STARRS 1 telescope at Haleakalā Observatory, Hawaii detected the object several hours later at 13:03 UTC. A group of astronomers investigating the Pan-STARRS 1 images, namely Bryce Bolin, Jan Kleyna, Larry Denneau, and Richard Wainscoat, noticed the object had a diffuse, comet-like appearance with two apparent nuclei separated 3 arcseconds apart and a tail extending more than 14 arcseconds out. They reported the object as a comet candidate to the Minor Planet Center, which alerted other astronomers for follow-up.

Follow-up observations from Cerro Tololo and South African Astronomical Observatory on 17 and 24 September 2013 confirmed the object's tail and split nucleus. Amateur astronomers were able to image P/2013 R3, with observers from Japan and Spain noting that the object had brightened by a magnitude or more after a week and a half since discovery. The Minor Planet Center announced the object as a new comet on 27 September 2013 and gave it the periodic comet designation P/2013 R3 (Catalina–PanSTARRS) that credited both Catalina Sky Survey and Pan-STARRS 1 for the discovery.

== Orbit and classification ==
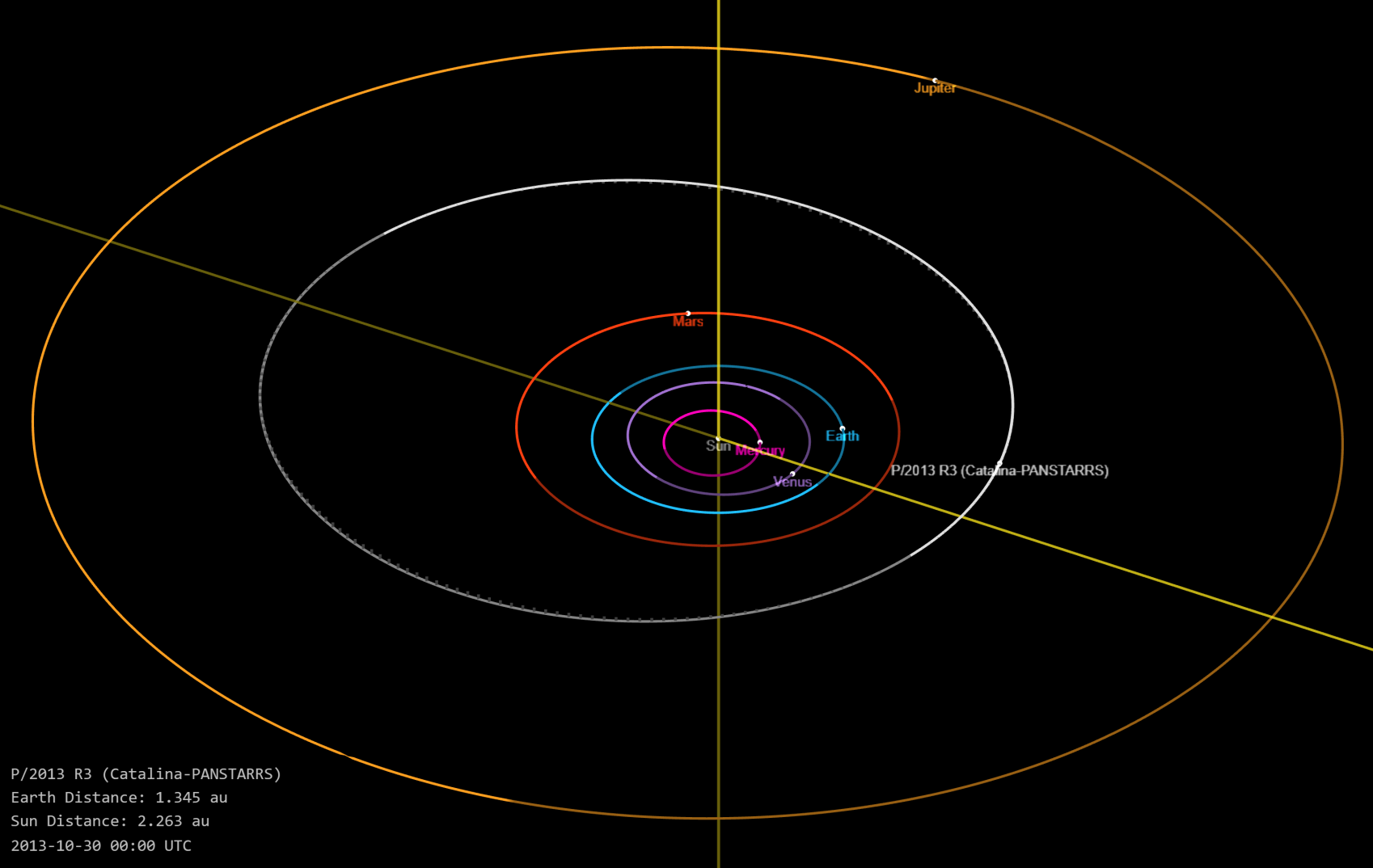
Oblique view of P/2013 R3's orbit

P/2013 R3 and its fragments orbit in the outer main asteroid belt at a semi-major axis of 3.03 AU from the Sun, completing one revolution every 5.28 years. It has a low orbital inclination of 0.90° with respect to the ecliptic and a modest orbital eccentricity of 0.273, which makes it come as close as 2.20 AU from the Sun at perihelion to as far as 3.86 AU from the Sun at aphelion. It last passed perihelion on 5 August 2013. The orbit of P/2013 R3 is very close to being in a 9:4 mean-motion resonance with Jupiter, which makes it subject to the planet's gravitational perturbations that can alter its orbit over millions of years.

P/2013 R3's orbit in the asteroid belt is unlike typical periodic comets, whose orbits were perturbed out of the Kuiper belt and Oort cloud by the planets. P/2013 R3's Tisserand parameter relative to Jupiter is greater than 3.08, which dynamically distinguishes it as an asteroid rather than a comet. Additionally, cometary volatile ices such as carbon monoxide are expected to have completely sublimated in the asteroid belt since the formation of the Solar System, which makes P/2013 R3 unlikely to be a traditional sublimating comet. For these reasons, P/2013 R3 is classified as an active asteroid, in recognition of its asteroid-like orbit and comet-like appearance.

=== Possible family ===
In 2018, an orbit analysis by Henry Hsieh and collaborators tentatively determined that one of the asteroid's fragments, P/2013 R3-B, may be related to the 290,000-year-old Mandragora asteroid family of C-type asteroids. However, they were unable to link the other fragment, P/2013 R3-A, to this same family, possibly due to orbital perturbations by the 9:4 Jupiter mean-motion resonance, non-gravitational acceleration by outgassing, or uncertainties in the orbit of P/2013 R3-A. The process by which the Mandragora family formed is unclear due to the unusually uniform size of most of its members; possible explanations include a cratering impact event or a cascading rotational fissioning of the parent body and followed by its fragments.

== Activity and disintegration ==
=== Mechanism ===
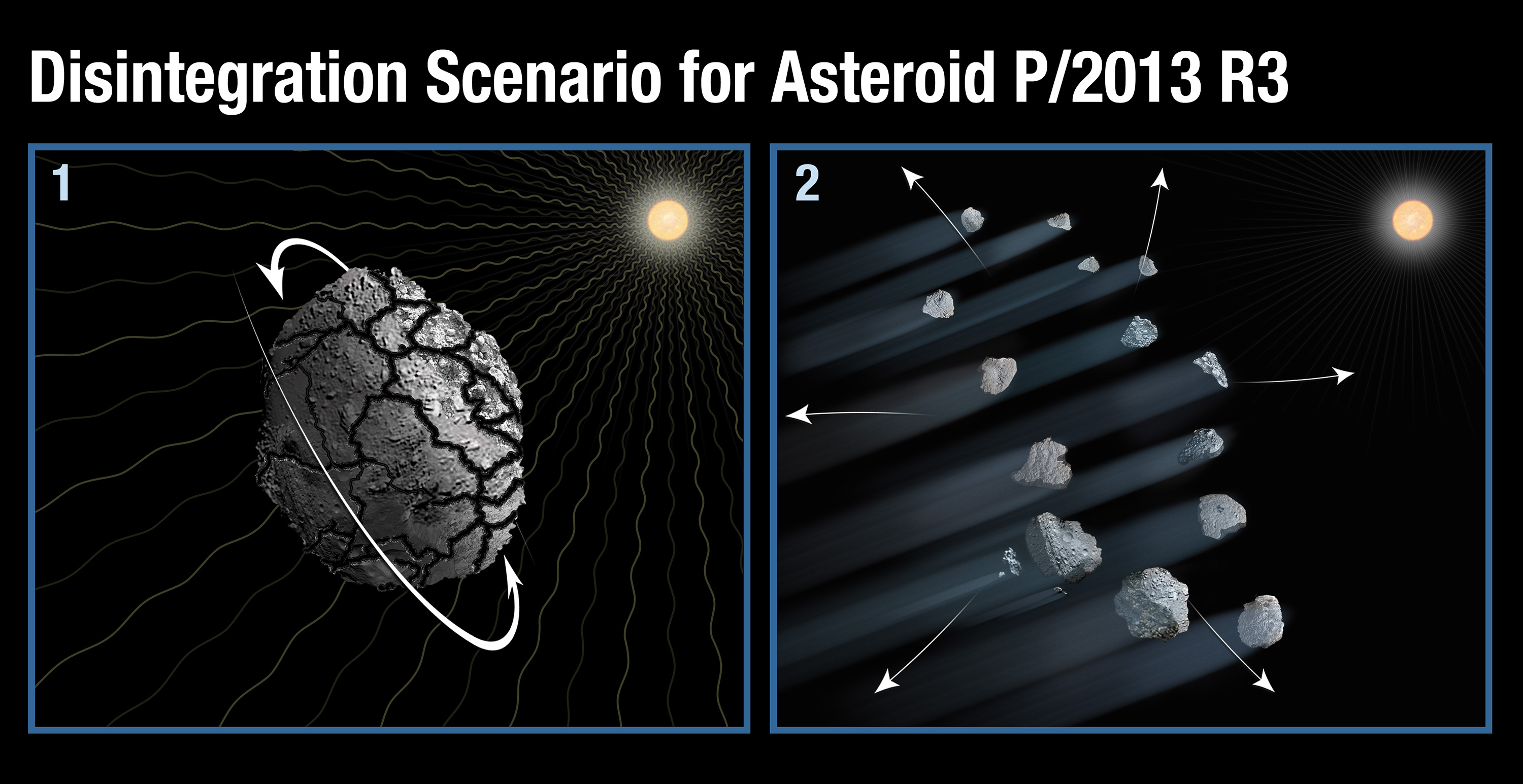
Illustration depicting the process of P/2013 R3's rotational disintegration by the YORP effect

The activity of P/2013 R3 was caused by the catastrophic rotational breakup of its nucleus, which progressively disintegrated into slow-moving fragments and dusty debris over several months. The combined cross-sectional areas of P/2013 R3's fragments suggest the asteroid's nucleus originally had a diameter of 800 m (2,600 ft) before it broke up. It is the first asteroid discovered while in the process of disintegrating.

Rotational breakup occurs when an asteroid rotates faster than the critical spin barrier period at 2.2 hours, below which centrifugal forces exceed the gravitational and interparticle van der Waals cohesive forces holding the asteroid together. Material along the asteroid's equator, where centrifugal forces are strongest, is ejected outward beyond the asteroid's gravitational escape speed (~0.5 m/s) and then disaggregates into discrete fragments due to interparticle cohesion.

The precursor of P/2013 R3 gradually spun up past the critical period due to a continuous yet subtle net torque on the asteroid's rotation, primarily caused by sunlight reflecting off the asteroid's irregular surface—a phenomenon known as the Yarkovsky–O'Keefe–Radzievskii–Paddack (YORP) effect. The YORP effect can spin up sub-kilometer-sized asteroids like P/2013 R3 below the critical period over a short timescale within one million years. Compared to the 150-million-year average rate of disruptive impact events for sub-kilometer main-belt asteroids, rotational breakup by the YORP effect occurs much more frequently by two orders of magnitude. Several active asteroids in the main belt are suspected of undergoing or approaching rotational breakup, such as 331P/Gibbs (P/2012 F5), 311P/PanSTARRS (P/2013 P5), and 6478 Gault.

In addition to the YORP effect, uneven outgassing of sublimating water ice may be in part responsible for spinning up P/2013 R3's precursor. Although there is no direct spectroscopic evidence of water sublimation in P/2013 R3, it is implied by the prolonged dust ejection of its fragments, whose subsurface ices are presumably exposed after the precursor's breakup. Without the YORP effect, constant water sublimation rates greater than 1×10^{−3} kg/s (1 g/s) can spin up sub-kilometer asteroids below the critical period in less than one million years and can be spectroscopically undetectable if the sublimation rate is below the observational lower limit of 1 kg/s.

==== Rotation period and internal structure ====
The rotation periods of P/2013 R3's precursor and fragments have not been photometrically measured due to heavy obscuration by surrounding debris. Depending on the precursor's size and density, the low relative speeds of P/2013 R3's fragments suggest that P/2013 R3's precursor had a rotation period between 0.48−1.9 hours before it began breaking up. This is well below the critical spin period, which implies that P/2013 R3's particles must have cohesion forces resisting centrifugal forces at a cohesive strength of 40–210 Pa, comparable to that of a pile of sand or talcum powder. This cohesive strength is characteristic of weakly-bound rubble pile asteroids like Bennu and Ryugu, whose internal structures have been thoroughly fractured by repeated meteoroid impacts over billions of years. If P/2013 R3 was a rubble pile of this cohesive strength, it should predominantly consist of micrometer-sized rock grains. However, this low cohesive strength fails to explain P/2013 R3's fragmentation according to computer simulations by Yun Zhang and collaborators in 2018, who find that rubble pile asteroids of P/2013 R3's size should begin fragmenting at higher cohesive strengths of at least 800 Pa.

=== Dust ===
P/2013 R3 continuously released dusty debris into space for the entire span of its disintegration, producing an enveloping dust cloud and tail that gave it its diffuse, comet-like appearance. The dust cloud has a spectrally neutral or gray color matching those of primitive, carbonaceous C-type asteroids. Because the dust cloud spans a large area for reflecting sunlight, it accounts for much of P/2013 R3's apparent brightness. Observations in October 2013 showed that the dust cloud initially had a scattering cross-sectional area of at least 30 km^{2} (12 mi^{2}) before reducing to 20 km^{2} (7.7 mi^{2}) by February 2014. During this time span, the total apparent magnitude of P/2013 R3 faded from magnitude 18 to 20.

In addition to the enveloping dust cloud, the individual fragments of P/2013 R3 each possessed their own comas and tails, sourced from dust ejected by rotational breakup and potentially sublimating water ice. Based on the fading rate of P/2013 R3's fragments, their dust ejection speed is inferred to be at least 0.13 m/s (0.43 ft/s).

Smaller dust particles were blown away by solar radiation pressure, leaving relatively large micrometer- to millimeter-sized particles behind.

Assuming that P/2013 R3's dust grains follow a similar size distribution to other fragmented asteroids and comets, the asteroid is estimated to have ejected a total of 2.3×10^{10} kg of dust over the course of its disintegration. This dust mass is equivalent to a 340 m (1,120 ft)-diameter solid sphere, for an assumed uniform density of 1.0 g/cm^{3}.

The asteroidal dust production rate contributes at least 4–20% to the zodiacal cloud.

== Fragments ==
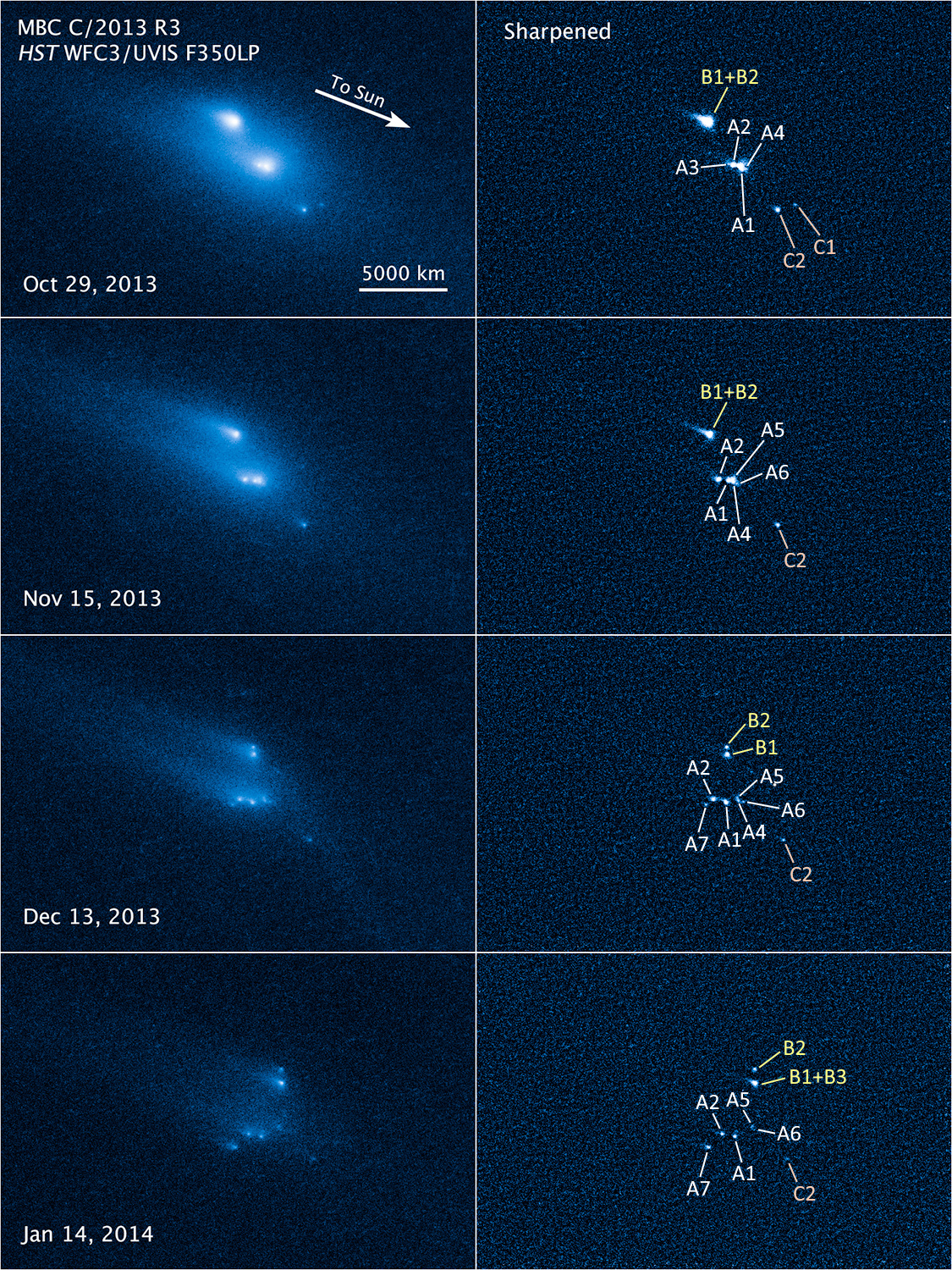
Gallery of Hubble images showing the disintegration of P/2013 R3 and its fragments (labeled in right panels) over time

When P/2013 R3 was discovered, it had already fragmented into two distinct co-moving components, named P/2013 R3-A and P/2013 R3-B. High-resolution observations by the 10-m Keck Telescope at Mauna Kea Observatory and the 10.4-m Gran Telescopio Canarias at Roque de los Muchachos Observatory in October 2013 revealed two more new fragments, named C and D, that had presumably split off from the main component A. Even higher-resolution observations by the Hubble Space Telescope starting in October 2013 revealed that component A was composed of many more smaller fragments, with component C having already split and component B later ejecting small fragments. Hubble observations continued until February 2014, when P/2013 R3 became unobservable as it entered conjunction with the Sun.

In total, at least thirteen fragments of P/2013 R3 have been identified. These fragments formed episodically over a period of at least 5 months. For an assumed geometric albedo of 0.05, the largest fragments, A1, A2, B1, and B2, all have diameters no larger than 400 m (1,300 ft). It is unknown which of these fragments is the largest in size and mass, as all of them are heavily obscured by the surrounding debris. With Hill spheres less than 20 km (12 mi) across, each fragment is separated far enough apart from each other (by several thousands of km) that their gravitational influence on each other is negligible. The fragments move at very low speeds of 0.2–0.5 m/s relative to each other, comparable to the gravitational escape speeds of the largest fragments, or less than the walking speed of a human.

=== Component A ===
P/2013 R3-A, also known as component A, was the brightest and presumed main component of P/2013 R3. It was the southwestern and trailing component of the pair of nuclei initially seen at discovery.

High-resolution observations by Hubble on 29 October 2013 revealed that component A was composed of four smaller fragments, named A1, A2, A3, and A4, that were embedded together in a 2,000 km (1,200 mi)-wide dust coma. Three of these fragments had just separated from each other a few days prior to these Hubble observations. Fragment A1 was the brightest fragment of component A and it is thought to be the parent body of all other fragments, potentially including components B, C, and D, but excluding A3. Fragment A3 is instead thought to have split off from fragment A2 around the time when it was first seen by Hubble on 29 October 2013.

By the time Hubble reobserved P/2013 R3 on 15 November 2013, fragment A3 had disappeared completely and fragment A1 had ejected two new fragments, named A5 and A6. Hubble observations on 13 December 2013 later found that fragment A2 had ejected another small fragment, named A7, which had separated sometime in between November and December at a relative speed of 0.46 m/s. The six remaining fragments of component A faded over time, with fragment A4 disappearing sometime in between 13 December 2013 and 14 January 2014. The fading eventually progressed to the point that the fragments of component A became unidentifiable by 13 February 2014.

=== Component B ===
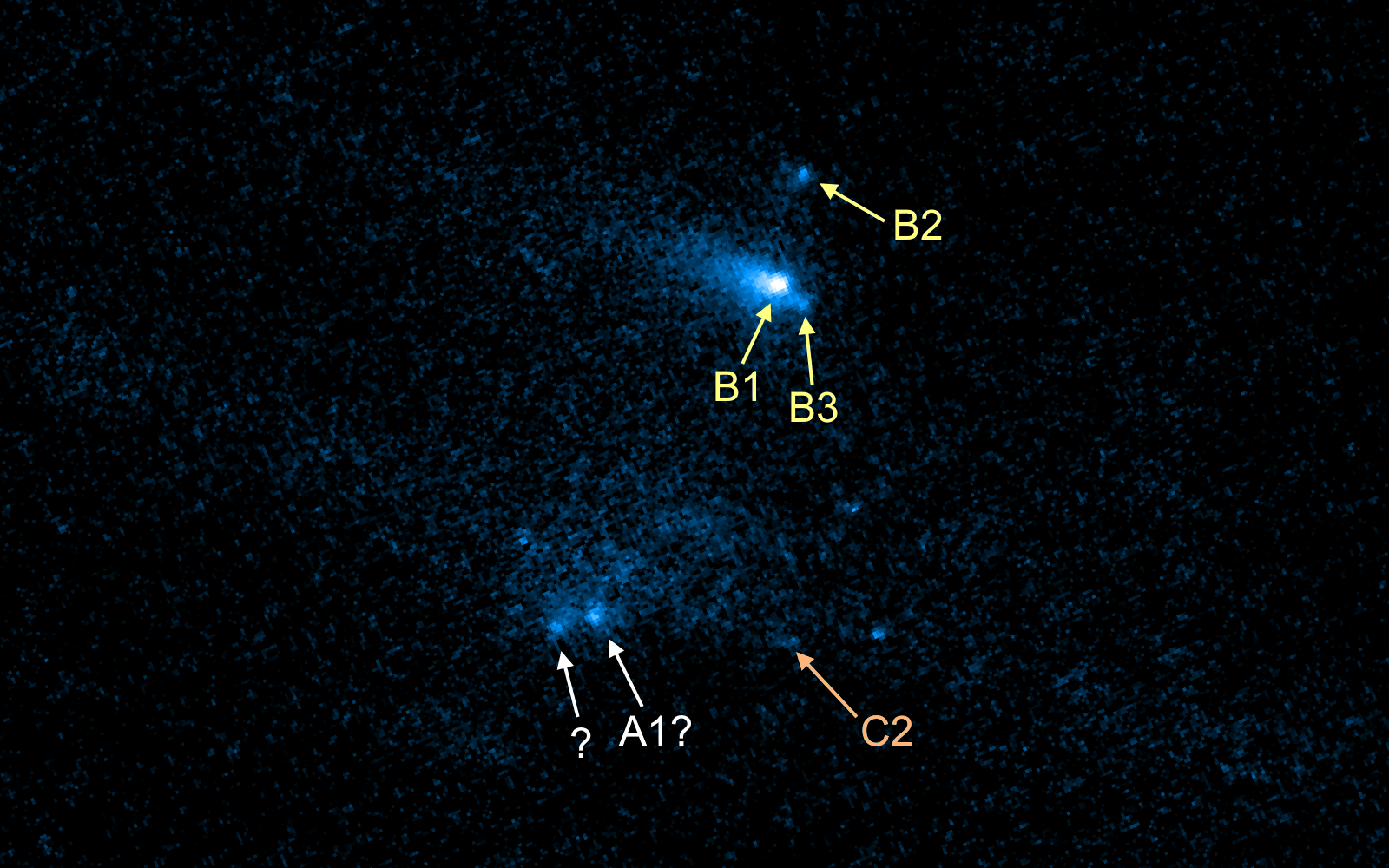
Final Hubble image of P/2013 R3 and its fragments (labeled) on 13 February 2014

P/2013 R3-B, also known as component B, (Note: Gran Telescopio Canarias observers Licandro et al. gave different provisional names for the fragments of P/2013 R3 prior to the publication of Jewitt et al. (2014). Component B was provisionally called component A, component C was provisionally called component B, and component D was provisionally called component C.) was the northeastern and leading component of the pair of nuclei initially seen at discovery. It was 23% as bright as component A and it was separated 3.4 arcseconds apart (projected distance of 3,100 km or 1,900 mi) when it was observed by the Gran Telescopio Canarias on 11 and 12 October 2013.

Observations by Hubble on 29 October 2013 showed that component B was initially a single object possessing its own dusty coma and tail. On 15 November 2013, component B began to split into two fragments, B1 and B2, that eventually moved far enough apart to be resolved by Hubble on 13 December 2013. The fainter fragment, B2, separated from B1 at a relative speed of 0.32 m/s and faded steadily with constant absolute magnitude. On the other hand, the brighter fragment B1 had its absolute magnitude brighten by more than a magnitude between 13 December 2013 and 14 January 2014, before ejecting another small fragment, B3, that was seen by Hubble on 13 February 2014. This sudden brightening of B1 may be associated with the beginning of B3's separation, based on similar behavior seen in comets before fragmenting.

=== Component C ===
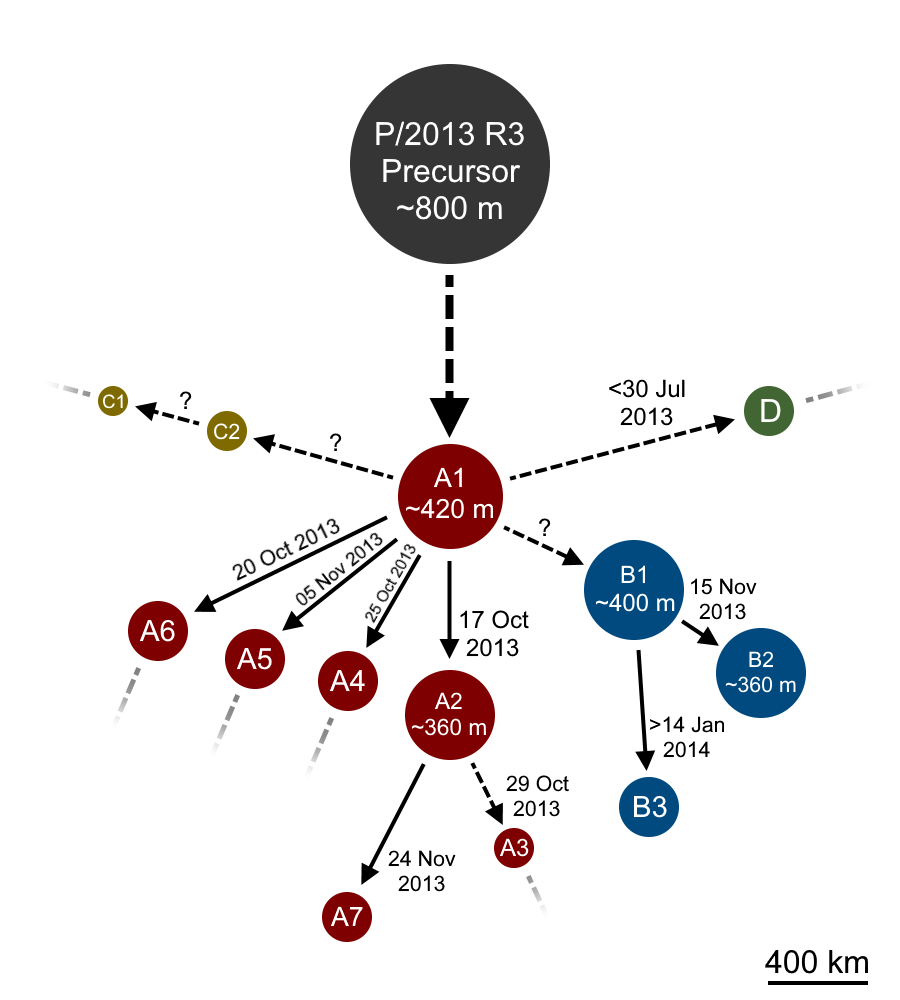
Schematic diagram illustrating the sizes and relationships between the fragments of P/2013 R3

A faint fragment, named component C, was first seen southwest of component A in Keck Telescope observations on 1 and 2 October 2013. It was detected again in Gran Telescopio Canarias observations on 11 and 12 October 2013 and 6.5-m Magellan Telescope observations on 28 and 29 October 2013. Component C was 5–10% as bright as component A and it was separated 2.4 arcseconds apart (projected distance of 2,500 km or 1,600 mi) at the time of the Gran Telescopio Canarias observations.

Observations by Hubble on 29 October 2013 revealed that component C had already split into two fragments, C1 and C2. With an area-projected diameter of 120 m (390 ft), fragment C1 was the smallest of the two fragments and it had promptly faded to invisibility by the time Hubble reobserved P/2013 R3 on 15 November 2013. The surviving fragment, C2, faded at a slower rate and did not experience any further fragmentation over the course of Hubble observations through 2013–2014. Based on its last observed brightness on 13 February 2014, fragment C2's area-projected diameter was around 160 m (520 ft).

=== Component D ===
An additional faint fragment, named component D, was discovered trailing far behind the main components' tail in Keck observations from 1 and 2 October 2013. Component D was detected again in Gran Telescopio Canarias observations on 11 and 12 October 2013. The fragment was 0.5% as bright as component A and it was widely separated 36 arcseconds apart (projected distance of 32,700 km or 20,300 mi) at the time of the Gran Telescopio Canarias observations. It was possibly last seen in Magellan Telescope observations on 29 October 2013, although it may have become too faint for confident identification.

For an assumed geometric albedo of 0.05 with minimal dust contamination, component D is less than 200 m (660 ft) in diameter. The separation time of component D is uncertain due to the lack of relative motion to other components during its short observational coverage. Keck observations from 1 and 2 October 2013 place an upper limit separation speed of ≤6 m/s, corresponding to a separation date sometime earlier than 30 July 2013. Component D's latest possible separation dates overlap with the separation date range for P/2013 R3's dust cloud, suggesting that these two events may be related.

Fragments of P/2013 R3 (Catalina–PanSTARRS)
Name	Final apparent magnitude	Final absolute magnitude (H_{V})	Area- equivalent diameter (m)	First observed (UT)	Last observed (UT)	Separation date (UT)	(day of year 2013)	Separation speed (m/s)	Parent	Child
A1	26.01±0.05	20.84±0.05	420	15 Sep 2013	13 Feb 2014					A2, A4, A5, A6, B1?, C2?, D?
A2	26.40±0.17	21.23±0.17	360	29 Oct 2013	13 Feb 2014	17 Oct 2013	290±10	0.23±0.05	A1	A3?, A7
A3				29 Oct 2013	29 Oct 2013	29 Oct 2013	~302		A2?	
A4				29 Oct 2013	13 Dec 2013	25 Oct 2013 (Note: Jewitt et al. (2017) incorrectly wrote fragment A4's separation date as "2013 Nov 03".)	298±10	0.33±0.05	A1	
A5				15 Nov 2013	14 Jan 2014	05 Nov 2013	309±10	0.33±0.05	A1	
A6				15 Nov 2013	14 Jan 2014	20 Oct 2013	294±10	0.31±0.05	A1	
A7				13 Dec 2013	14 Jan 2014	24 Nov 2013	328±10	0.46±0.05	A2	
B1	24.76±0.14	19.59±0.14	<740 (Note: Fragment B1 significantly brightened between 13 December 2013 and 14 January 2013 due to a fragmentation event that led to the formation of fragment B3. Prior to this, B1 had an apparent magnitude of 24.89±0.02 and an absolute magnitude of 20.63±0.02 on 13 December 2013, corresponding to an area-equivalent diameter of 460 m (1,510 ft).)	15 Sep 2013	13 Feb 2014				A1?	B2, B3
B2	26.31±0.11	21.14±0.11	360	13 Dec 2013	13 Feb 2014	15 Nov 2013	319±10	0.32±0.02	B1	
B3				13 Feb 2014	13 Feb 2014	>14 Jan 2014	>379	>0.28	B1	
C1	26.73±0.14	23.59±0.14	120	29 Oct 2013	29 Oct 2013				C2?	
C2	28.00±0.30	22.83±0.30	160	01 Oct 2013	13 Feb 2014				A1?	C1?
D	24.8±0.1	22.45	200	01 Oct 2013	12 Oct 2013	<30 July 2013	<211	<6	A1?	

== Aftermath ==
After P/2013 R3 left conjunction with the Sun, astronomers attempted reobserving the asteroid's remains with the Hubble, Keck, and Very Large Telescope in 2014–2015. Hubble observations from 29 September 2014 to 26 May 2015 probed P/2013 R3's expected location down to a limiting magnitude of 28 within a 162 arcsecond field of view, but did not find any signs of a dusty debris trail or fragments larger than 280 m (920 ft) in diameter. Keck telescope observations from 17 February 2015 to 8 December 2015 searched a wider field of view of 360 arcseconds around P/2013 R3's predicted location, but found no dust nor fragments larger than 800 m (2,600 ft) in diameter. Very Large Telescope observations from 18 January 2015 searched an even wider field of view of 7.2 arcminutes (432 arcseconds) and also found no dust nor fragments larger than 220 m (720 ft) in diameter. The large dust grains and fragments of P/2013 R3 should not have dispersed appreciably by solar radiation pressure around that time, so these non-detections of P/2013 R3 most likely indicate that astronomers missed the asteroid due to inaccurate predictions for its location.

== See also ==
- (29075) 1950 DA – a kilometer-sized near-Earth asteroid stably rotating faster than the 2.2 hour critical spin period due to cohesive forces
- Active asteroid
  - (300163) 2006 VW139 – a binary active asteroid consisting of widely-separated components
  - 354P/LINEAR (P/2010 A2) – a main-belt asteroid that was impacted by another asteroid sometime before 2010
  - P/2016 J1 (PanSTARRS) – a pair of active asteroid fragments that split apart in early 2010
