= (458271) 2010 UM26 and (796785) 2010 RN221 =

Pair of main-belt asteroids

(458271) 2010 UM_{26} and (796785) 2010 RN_{221}
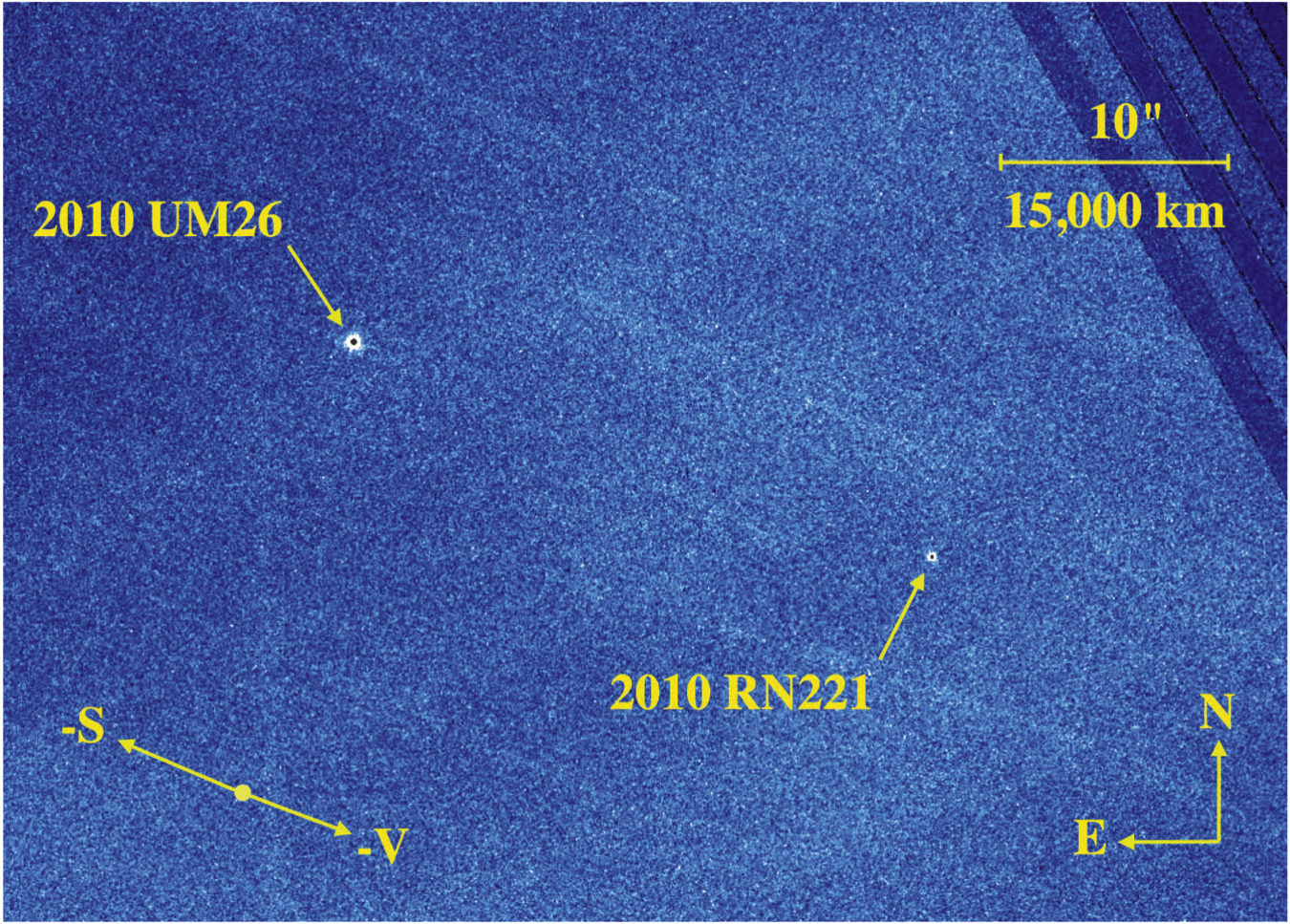
- 2010 UM_{26} and 2010 RN_{221} imaged by the Hubble Space Telescope on 4 January 2023

Discovery
- Discovered by: Spacewatch (UM_{26}); Mt. Lemmon Survey (RN_{221})
- Discovery site: Kitt Peak Obs. (UM_{26}); Mt. Lemmon Obs. (RN_{221})
- Discovery date: 10 November 2006 (UM_{26}); 11 September 2010 (RN_{221})

Designations
- Minor planet category: main-belt (middle)

Orbital characteristics
- Epoch 13 September 2023 (JD 2460200.5)
- Uncertainty parameter 0
- Observation arc: 17.15 yr (6,265 days)
- Earliest precovery date: 14 May 2005
- Aphelion: 3.415 AU
- Perihelion: 1.738 AU
- Semi-major axis: 2.577 AU
- Eccentricity: 0.3256
- Orbital period (sidereal): 4.14 yr (1,511 days)
- Mean anomaly: 65.868° (UM_{26}); 65.863° (RN_{221})
- Mean motion: 0° 14^{m} 17.877^{s} / day (UM_{26}); 0° 14^{m} 17.875^{s} / day (RN_{221})
- Inclination: 3.883°
- Longitude of ascending node: 234.869°
- Argument of perihelion: 120.270°

Physical characteristics
- Mean diameter: 760 m (UM_{26}); 350 m (RN_{221})
- Synodic rotation period: 5.9±0.6 h (UM_{26}) ≥20 h (RN_{221})
- Geometric albedo: ≈0.20 (assumed S-type)
- Absolute magnitude (H): 17.80 (UM_{26}); 19.24±0.36 (RN_{221})

(458271) 2010 UM_{26} and (796785) 2010 RN_{221} are a pair of main-belt asteroids that have identical orbits around the Sun. These two asteroids are thought to have dissociated from a binary system sometime in the 2000s, which would make them one of the youngest asteroid pairs known. The larger member of this pair, (458271) 2010 UM_{26} (or simply 2010 UM_{26}), is about 760 m (2,490 ft) in diameter and was discovered on 10 November 2006 by the Spacewatch survey at Kitt Peak Observatory. The smaller member, (796785) 2010 RN_{221} (or simply 2010 RN_{221}), is about 350 m (1,150 ft) in diameter and was discovered on 11 September 2010 by the Mount Lemmon Survey at Mount Lemmon Observatory. The similarity of the orbits of these asteroids was first noticed by astronomers in February 2022.

== History ==
=== Observations ===
2010 UM_{26} was discovered on 10 November 2006 by the Spacewatch survey at Kitt Peak Observatory. The asteroid was then reobserved once by Spacewatch and Mount Lemmon Survey on 13 December 2006. However, the number of observations was too sparse to accurately determine the asteroid's orbit, so it did not receive a provisional minor planet designation from the Minor Planet Center (MPC) and became a lost minor planet. On 11 September and 28–29 October 2010, Mt. Lemmon Survey and Spacewatch reobserved the asteroid and other observatories began providing follow-up observations in November 2010 to secure its orbit. The MPC gave the asteroid its provisional designation 2010 UM_{26} on 7 November 2010 and later linked its 2010 observations to its 2006 discovery on 26 December 2010. The MPC gave 2010 UM_{26} the minor planet catalog number of 458271 on 22 February 2016 and established official discovery credit to Spacewatch's 2006 observations.

2010 RN_{221} was discovered on 11 September 2010 by the Mount Lemmon Survey at Mount Lemmon Observatory. However, the MPC did not recognize the asteroid's existence until 2021, when additional observations were linked to the discovery observations. The MPC gave 2010 RN_{221} the minor planet catalog number of 796785 on 22 May 2025.

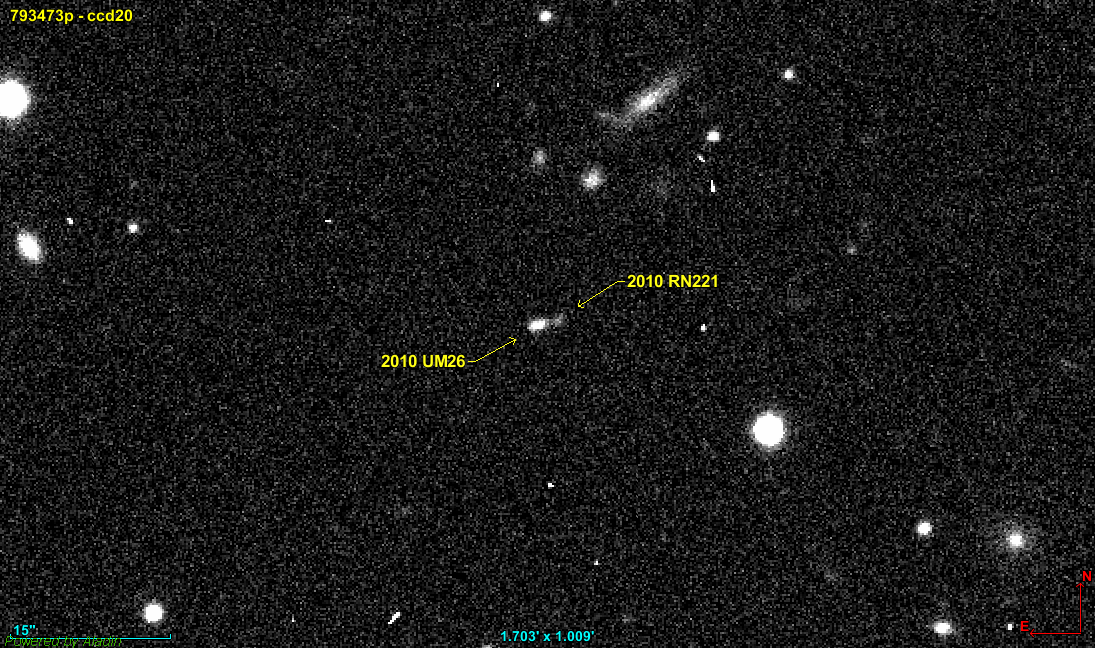
Canada–France–Hawaii Telescope precovery image of 2010 UM_{26} and 2010 RN_{221} from 14 May 2005

=== Asteroid pair discovery ===
On 15 February 2022, Alessandro Odasso reported to the online Minor Planets Mailing List that 2010 UM_{26} and 2010 RN_{221} had extremely similar orbits. He noticed that the two asteroids approached very close to each other in 2003 according to his numerical integration of their orbits, which led him to suspect that they may have separated from a common progenitor. Odasso suspected that it could not be a single object mistaken as two asteroids; Peter Vereš of the MPC staff team confirmed that they are indeed two separate asteroids. On that same day, Sam Deen found precovery observations of 2010 UM_{26} and 2010 RN_{221} appearing close together in archival Canada–France–Hawaii Telescope images from 14 May 2005. A more rigorous study of the asteroid pair was published in Astronomy & Astrophysics by David Vokrouhlický and collaborators in November 2022, who acknowledged Odasso and Deen for independently discovering the asteroid pair.

== Orbit ==
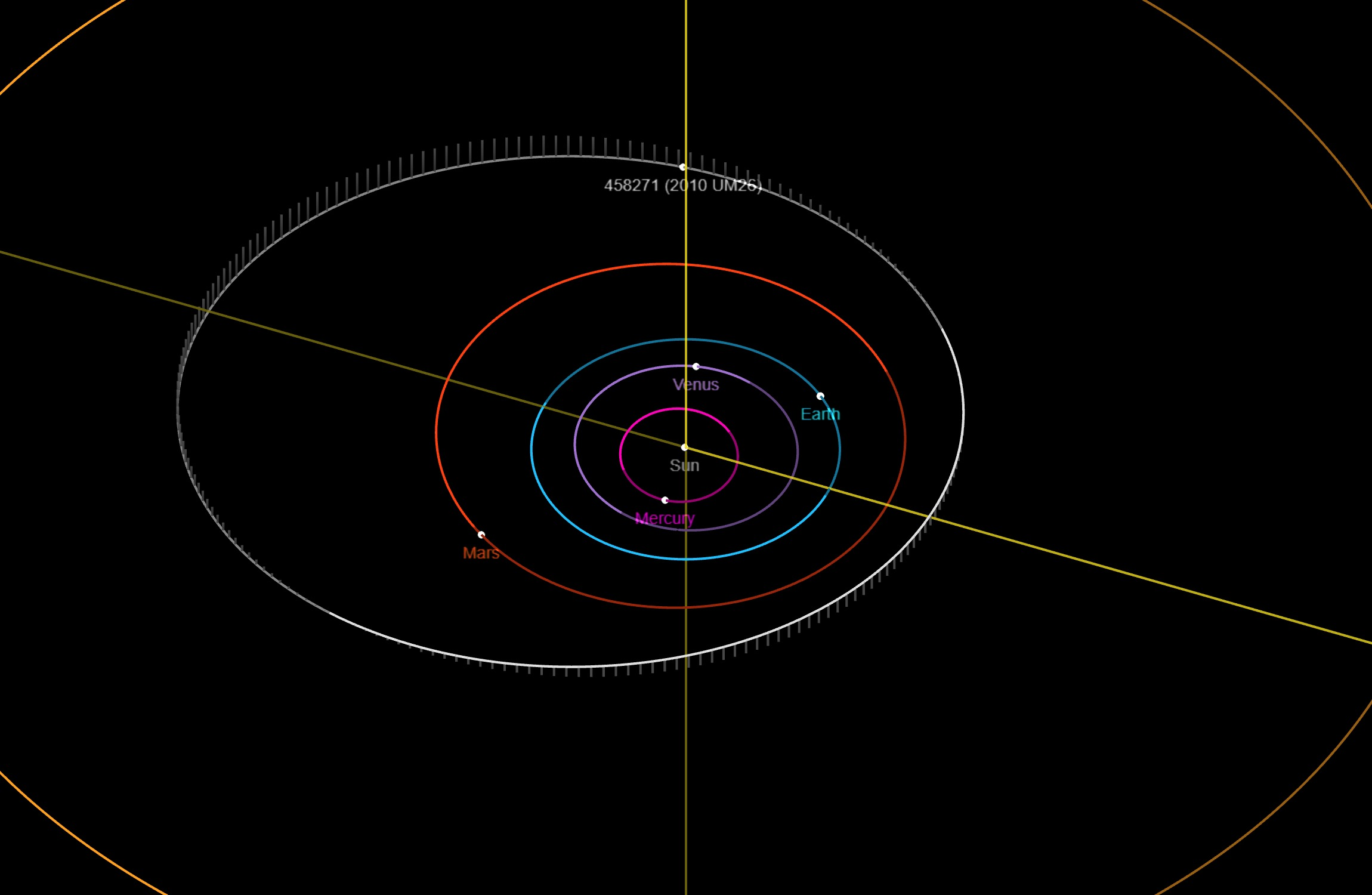
Orbit diagram of 2010 UM_{26} and 2010 RN_{221}. The orbits and positions of these two asteroids are virtually identical in this diagram.

2010 UM_{26} and 2010 RN_{221} both orbit the Sun in the middle zone of the main asteroid belt. They share extremely similar elliptical orbits with semi-major axes of 2.58 astronomical units (386 million km, 240 million mi) and orbital periods of 4.14 years. With orbital eccentricities of 0.326, the two asteroids come as close as 1.74 AU (260 million km; 162 million mi) from the Sun at perihelion to as far as 3.42 AU (512 million km; 318 million mi) at aphelion. The asteroids' orbits are inclined 3.9° with respect to the plane of the Solar System. The asteroids' mean anomalies, or angular positions along their orbits, differ by less than 0.01°.

== Formation ==
Asteroid pairs and binaries are thought to have formed from the rotational fissioning of a single precursor asteroid, as a result of rotational acceleration by the uneven reflection of sunlight off the asteroid's surface—a phenomenon known as the Yarkovsky–O'Keefe–Radzievskii–Paddack (YORP) effect. For asteroids with diameters under 1 km (0.62 mi), the YORP effect can double their rotation rates within timescales of 1 million years, eventually leading to the ejection of surface material and disruption of their internal structures due to excessive centrifugal forces. Rotational fission preferentially occurs if the precursor asteroid's internal structure is weak, like a rubble pile consisting of rocks and dust loosely held together by gravity.

Orbit simulations of 2010 UM_{26} and 2010 RN_{221} indicate that there is a 55% probability that the two asteroids separated after the year 2000, with the most likely date being March 2003. According to these simulations, the two asteroids came within 1,000 km (620 mi) of each other in March 2003, with a range of possible close approach distances that could reach inside the ≈230 km (140 mi)-radius Hill sphere of 2010 UM_{26}. The relative velocities between the two asteroids in March 2003 were extremely small; there is a 99% probability that their relative velocities were less than 3 cm/s (1.2 in/s) at that time, which is much less than the ≈50 cm/s (20 in/s) escape velocity of 2010 UM_{26}. It is possible but very unlikely that 2010 UM_{26} and 2010 RN_{221} could have separated before the 2000s.

On 4 January 2023, David C. Jewitt and collaborators observed 2010 UM_{26} and 2010 RN_{221} with the Hubble Space Telescope to search for dusty debris that might have been ejected from the separation of 2010 UM_{26} and 2010 RN_{221}. They found no evidence of a dust trail nor macroscopic fragments larger than 36 m (118 ft) in diameter, which implies that the asteroid pair did not separate directly through rotational fission like the fragmenting active asteroid 331P/Gibbs. Jewitt and collaborators proposed that the pair separated by dissociating from a preexisting binary system, as a result of orbital expansion by gravitational perturbations and solar radiation pressure. A binary system like this can be formed by rotational fissioning of a single asteroid, but the split components can remain in orbit for over 100 years, enough time for solar radiation pressure to completely clear any dust and macroscopic fragments from the binary system by the time they dissociate.

== Physical characteristics ==
Little is known about the sizes, albedos, and spectral types of 2010 UM_{26} and 2010 RN_{221}, since none these properties have been directly measured. Jewitt and collaborators examined archival Wide-field Infrared Survey Explorer (WISE) images of the asteroid pair from 2010, but were unable to detect any conclusive signs of infrared thermal emissions from either asteroid, thus precluding the measurement of their albedos. Nevertheless, Jewitt and collaborators assume a silicate (S-type) composition with a geometric albedo of 0.20 for 2010 UM_{26} and 2010 RN_{221}, since other asteroid pairs are known to have these characteristics. Using this assumed albedo for the asteroids' absolute magnitudes, they estimate diameters of 760 m (2,490 ft) and 350 m (0.22 mi) for 2010 UM_{26} and 2010 RN_{221}, respectively.

Hubble observations of 2010 UM_{26} and 2010 RN_{221} in 2023 showed that 2010 UM_{26} is slightly elongated (aspect ratio 1.15:1) and rotates in 5.9 hours, whereas 2010 RN_{221} is highly elongated (aspect ratio >2.5:1) and rotates slowly with a period of at least 20 hours. The particularly elongated shape of 2010 RN_{221} challenges previous theories that elongated secondary components of binary asteroid systems should have been destroyed by rotational fission; this implies that 2010 RN_{221} had either somehow avoided rotational fission or had undergone reshaping after it had fissioned from the primary component.

== See also ==
- P/2016 J1 (PanSTARRS) – Pair of main-belt comets thought to have recently split apart
- (300163) 2006 VW139 – A widely-separated binary main-belt comet
