= 483P/PanSTARRS =

Pair of active asteroids

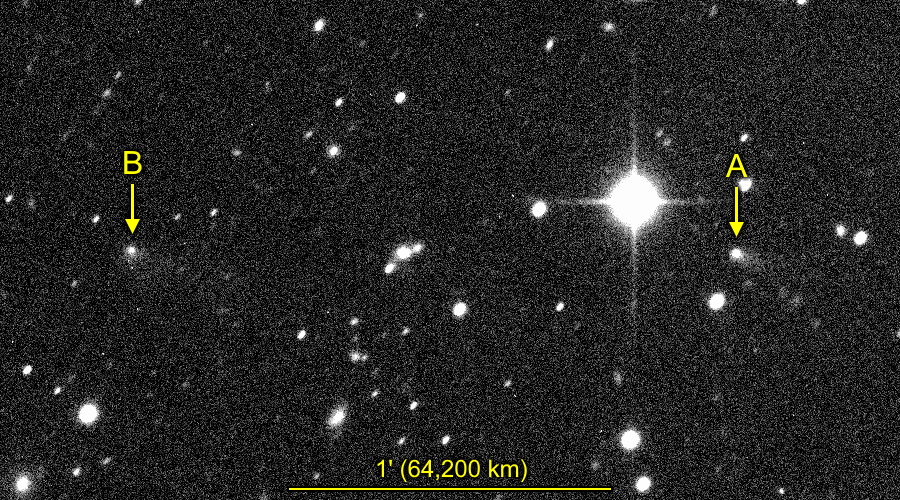
- Canada-France-Hawaii Telescope image of split asteroid pair P/2016 J1 on 6 May 2016, showing comet-like tails on both components

Discovery
- Discovered by: Pan-STARRS 1
- Discovery site: Haleakalā Observatory
- Discovery date: 5 May 2016

Designations
- Alternative designations: P/2016 J1 (PanSTARRS)

Orbital characteristics (fragment A)
- Epoch: 21 June 2016 (JD 2457560.5)
- Observation arc: 153 days (A); 140 days (B)
- Earliest precovery date: 4 March 2016
- Orbit type: main-belt (outer) · Encke-type · periodic
- Aphelion: 3.896 AU
- Perihelion: 2.448 AU
- Semi-major axis: 3.172 AU
- Eccentricity: 0.2283
- Orbital period: 5.65 yr (2,064 days)
- Inclination: 14.330°
- Longitude of ascending node: 199.856°
- Argument of periapsis: 46.585°
- Last perihelion: 20 February 2022
- Next perihelion: 14 November 2027
- T_{Jupiter}: 3.113
- Earth MOID: 1.461 AU
- Jupiter MOID: 1.227 AU

Physical characteristics
- Mean diameter: <0.62+0.18 −0.10 km (A) <0.34+0.12 −0.06 m (B)
- Geometric albedo: 0.04 (assumed)
- Spectral type: C/G; B–V = 0.74±0.04 (A); B–V = 0.74±0.12 (B); V–R = 0.36±0.04 (A); V–R = 0.39±0.12 (B)
- Comet total magnitude (M1): 16.4±0.4 (A); 17.3±0.8 (B)
- Comet nuclear magnitude (M2): >19.95+0.18 −0.16 (A) >21.26+0.23 −0.26 (B)

483P/PanSTARRS (provisional designation P/2016 J1) is a pair of active main-belt asteroids that split apart from each other in early 2010. The brighter and larger component of the pair, P/2016 J1-A, was discovered first by the Pan-STARRS 1 survey at Haleakalā Observatory on 5 May 2016. Follow-up observations by the Canada-France-Hawaii Telescope at Mauna Kea Observatory discovered the second component, P/2016 J1-B, on 6 May 2016. Both asteroids are smaller than 1 kilometre (0.62 mi) in diameter, with P/2016 J1-A being roughly 0.6 km (0.37 mi) in diameter and P/2016 J1-B being roughly 0.3 km (0.19 mi) in diameter. The two components recurrently exhibit cometary activity as they approach the Sun near perihelion, suggesting that their activity is driven by sublimation of volatile compounds such as water.

== Orbit ==
=== Asteroid family ===
In 2018, an orbit analysis by Hsieh et al. found that both components of P/2016 J1 are related to the Theobalda asteroid family of C-, F-, and X-type asteroids. The Theobalda family likely originated as fragments from an impact event that shattered a 78 ± 9 km (48 ± 6 mi)-diameter parent body 6.9±2.3 million years ago. Another ice-sublimating active asteroid, 427P/ATLAS (P/2017 S5), was also identified to be part the Theobalda family, suggesting that some members of this family were able to retain subsurface water ice since the collision that formed them.

== See also ==
- Asteroid pair
  - (458271) 2010 UM_{26} and (796785) 2010 RN_{221} – a pair of main-belt asteroids thought to have recently dissociated from a binary system
- Active asteroid
  - (300163) 2006 VW139 – A widely-separated binary main-belt comet
  - P/2013 R3 (Catalina–PanSTARRS) – an active asteroid that completely disintegrated due to rotational breakup
  - 331P/Gibbs – another active asteroid disintegrating and fragmenting by rotational breakup

Numbered comets
Previous; 482P/PanSTARRS	483P/PanSTARRS	Next; 484P/Spacewatch
