= Asteroid pair =

Two asteroids that were once in binary

An asteroid pair, or (if more than two bodies) an asteroid cluster, are asteroids which at some point in the past had very small relative velocities, and are typically formed either by a collisional break-up of a parent body, or from binary asteroids which became gravitationally unbound and are now following similar but different orbits around the Sun.

A possible example of a pair are the Trojan asteroids 1583 Antilochus and 3801 Thrasymedes. The proposer of that pair, Andrea Milani, found five other potential asteroid clusters in the Greek camp, clustered around the asteroids 1437 Diomedes, 1647 Menelaus, 2456 Palamedes, 2797 Teucer and 4035 Thestor.

The youngest asteroid pairs discovered as of 2022 include the main-belt asteroids P/2016 J1-A/B (separated c. 2010) and (458271) 2010 UM_{26}/(796785) 2010 RN_{221} (separated c. 2003). The former pair is particularly remarkable for exhibiting comet-like activity due to water ice sublimation and rotational break-up.
