= 1647 Menelaus =

Trojan asteroid

Discovery
- Discovered by: S. B. Nicholson
- Discovery site: Palomar Obs.
- Discovery date: 23 June 1957

Designations
- Pronunciation: /mɛnəˈleɪəs/
- Named after: Menelaus (Greek mythology)
- Alternative designations: 1957 MK
- Minor planet category: Jupiter trojan Greek · background
- Adjectives: Menelaian

Orbital characteristics
- Epoch 23 March 2018 (JD 2458200.5)
- Uncertainty parameter 0
- Observation arc: 65.57 yr (23,949 d)
- Aphelion: 5.3255 AU
- Perihelion: 5.1006 AU
- Semi-major axis: 5.2130 AU
- Eccentricity: 0.0216
- Orbital period (sidereal): 11.90 yr (4,347 d)
- Mean anomaly: 101.16°
- Mean motion: 0° 4^{m} 58.08^{s} / day
- Inclination: 5.6507°
- Longitude of ascending node: 240.32°
- Argument of perihelion: 298.95°
- Jupiter MOID: 0.1563 AU
- T_{Jupiter}: 2.9900

Physical characteristics
- Mean diameter: 42.72±0.517 km
- Synodic rotation period: 17.74±0.01 h
- Geometric albedo: 0.056±0.009
- Spectral type: C (assumed); V–R = 0.428±0.043; V–I = 0.866±0.043
- Absolute magnitude (H): 10.5

1647 Menelaus /mɛnəˈleɪəs/ is a mid-sized Jupiter trojan from the Greek camp, approximately 42 kilometers (26 miles) in diameter. It was discovered on 23 June 1957 by American astronomer Seth Nicholson at the Palomar Observatory in California and later named after the Spartan King Menelaus from Greek mythology. The dark asteroid has a rotation period of 17.7 hours. It is the principal body of the proposed Menelaus cluster, which encompasses several, mostly tentative Jovian asteroid families.

== Orbit and classification ==
Menelaus is a dark Jovian asteroid in a 1:1 orbital resonance with Jupiter. It is located in the leading Greek camp at the Gas Giant's L_{4} Lagrangian point, 60° ahead of its orbit. Since the discovery of the first Jupiter trojan, 588 Achilles, by astronomer Max Wolf in 1906, more than 7000 Jovian asteroids have already been discovered.

It orbits the Sun at a distance of 5.1–5.3 AU once every 11 years and 11 months (4,347 days; semi-major axis of 5.21 AU). Its orbit has an eccentricity of 0.02 and an inclination of 6° concerning the ecliptic. Menelaus was first imaged at Palomar in November 1951. This precovery extends the body's observation arc by more than 5 years before its official discovery observation.

=== Menelaus cluster ===
In 1993, Andrea Milani suggested that Menelaus might be the parent body of an asteroid family based on a modified HCM-analysis. The finding was also mentioned by David C. Jewitt in 2004, who noted that the Menelaus family is the largest proposed dynamic family to exist among the Jupiter trojans, despite having only eight members. (Note: Members of the Menelaus cluster identified by Milani in 1993 are 1749 Telamon, 3548 Eurybates, (6053) 1993 BW3, 6076 Plavec, (6002) 1988 RO, 6051 Anaximenes and 6006 Anaximandros, some of which are main-belt or Amor asteroids (Milani 1993, p. 94). Besides the Menelaus family, Milani found four other potential families in the Greek camp, clustered around the Jovian asteroids 1437 Diomedes, 2456 Palamedes, 2797 Teucer and (4035) 1986 WD, as well as the asteroid pair 1583 Antilochus—3801 Thrasymedes.)

In 2008, Fernando Roig and Ricardo Gil-Hutton described this particular aggregation of Jupiter trojans as the "Menelaus clan," which, similar to the Flora family in the inner asteroid belt, is composed of several families (or subfamilies). In this publication, the Menelaus clan encompasses a dozen clusters if the separation criteria used in the HCM analysis are sufficiently relaxed. The principal bodies of these proposed family-like clusters include: 1647 Menelaus, 3548 Eurybates, 1749 Telamon, 12973 Melanthios, 13062 Podarkes, 5436 Eumelos, 2148 Epeios, 4007 Euryalos, 4138 Kalchas, 3063 Makhaon and others.

Except for the Eurybates family, which was studied in more detail by Jakub Rozehnal and Miroslav Brož in 2011 (also see 3548 Eurybates § Eurybates family), all other proposed families with their principal bodies in the Menelaus clan, including Menelaus itself, are tentative and not listed neither on the Asteroids—Dynamic Site (Milani and Knežević) nor included in the robust HCM-analysis by Nesvorný (also see Asteroid family § All families). Instead, these bodies are considered non-family asteroids of the Jovian background population.

== Naming ==
This minor planet was named after the Greek mythological figure, Menelaus, husband of Helen of Troy, brother of Agamemnon, and king and leader of the Spartan contingent of the Greek army during the Trojan War. The discoverer followed the convention to name bodies located in the camp to the east of Jupiter after famous Greek heroes.

The Dictionary of Minor Planet Names also mentions that the lunar crater Menelaus was named after the Greek hero. However, based on the official International Astronomical Union–WGPSN nomenclature, it is named after Greek geometer and astronomer Menelaus of Alexandria (70–140). The official naming citation was published by the Minor Planet Center in June 1960 (M.P.C. 2019).

== Physical characteristics ==
Menelaus is an assumed C-type, while most larger Jupiter trojans are D-type asteroids. It has a V–I color index of 0.866.

=== Rotation period ===
The Palomar Transient Factory in California obtained a rotational light curve of Menelaus from photometric observation in the R-band in October 2010. It gave a rotation period of 17.7390 hours with a brightness variation of 0.32 magnitude in the R-band (U=2). In February 2014, a refined period of 17.74±0.01 hours with an amplitude of 0.15 magnitude was determined by American astronomer Robert D. Stephens at the Center for Solar System Studies (U=3-). (Note: Lightcurve plots of (1647) Menelaus from Jan–Feb 2014 by Robert Stephens at the Center for Solar System Studies (U81). Quality code is 3- (lightcurve rating at CS3). Summary figures at the LCDB and CS3.)

=== Diameter and albedo ===
According to the survey by NASA's Wide-field Infrared Survey Explorer with its subsequent NEOWISE mission, Menelaus measures 42.72 kilometers in diameter, and its surface has an albedo of 0.056. The Collaborative Asteroid Lightcurve Link assumes a standard albedo for carbonaceous asteroids of 0.057 and calculates a diameter of 44.22 kilometers using an absolute magnitude of 10.5.

100+ largest Jupiter trojans

Largest Jupiter Trojans by survey^{(A)} (mean-diameter in kilometers; RP: rotation period in hours; YoD: Year of Discovery)
| Designation | H | WISE | IRAS | Akari | Ln | RP | V–I | YoD | Ref |
|---|---|---|---|---|---|---|---|---|---|
| 624 Hektor | 7.2 | 225 | 233 | 230.99 | L4 | 6.92 | 0.930 | 1907 | list |
| 617 Patroclus | 8.19 | 140.362 | 140.92 | 140.85 | L5 | 102.80 | 0.830 | 1906 | list |
| 911 Agamemnon | 7.89 | 131.038 | 166.66 | 185.30 | L4 | 6.59 | 0.980 | 1919 | list |
| 588 Achilles | 8.67 | 130.099 | 135.47 | 133.22 | L4 | 7.31 | 0.940 | 1906 | list |
| 3451 Mentor | 8.4 | 126.288 | 116.30 | 117.91 | L5 | 7.70 | 0.770 | 1984 | list |
| 3317 Paris | 8.3 | 118.790 | 116.26 | 120.45 | L5 | 7.09 | 0.950 | 1984 | list |
| 1867 Deiphobus | 8.3 | 118.220 | 122.67 | 131.31 | L5 | 58.66 | 0.930 | 1971 | list |
| 1172 Äneas | 8.33 | 118.020 | 142.82 | 148.66 | L5 | 8.71 | 0.950 | 1930 | list |
| 1437 Diomedes | 8.3 | 117.786 | 164.31 | 172.60 | L4 | 24.49 | 0.810 | 1937 | list |
| 1143 Odysseus | 7.93 | 114.624 | 125.64 | 130.81 | L4 | 10.11 | 0.860 | 1930 | list |
| 2241 Alcathous | 8.64 | 113.682 | 114.63 | 118.87 | L5 | 7.69 | 0.940 | 1979 | list |
| 659 Nestor | 8.99 | 112.320 | 108.87 | 107.06 | L4 | 15.98 | 0.790 | 1908 | list |
| 3793 Leonteus | 8.7 | 112.046 | 86.26 | 87.58 | L4 | 5.62 | 0.780 | 1985 | list |
| 3063 Makhaon | 8.4 | 111.655 | 116.14 | 114.34 | L4 | 8.64 | 0.830 | 1983 | list |
| 1583 Antilochus | 8.6 | 108.842 | 101.62 | 111.69 | L4 | 31.54 | 0.950 | 1950 | list |
| 884 Priamus | 8.81 | 101.093 | 96.29 | 119.99 | L5 | 6.86 | 0.900 | 1917 | list |
| 1208 Troilus | 8.99 | 100.477 | 103.34 | 111.36 | L5 | 56.17 | 0.740 | 1931 | list |
| 1173 Anchises | 8.89 | 99.549 | 126.27 | 120.49 | L5 | 11.60 | 0.780 | 1930 | list |
| 2207 Antenor | 8.89 | 97.658 | 85.11 | 91.32 | L5 | 7.97 | 0.950 | 1977 | list |
| 2363 Cebriones | 9.11 | 95.976 | 81.84 | 84.61 | L5 | 20.05 | 0.910 | 1977 | list |
| 4063 Euforbo | 8.7 | 95.619 | 102.46 | 106.38 | L4 | 8.85 | 0.950 | 1989 | list |
| 2357 Phereclos | 8.94 | 94.625 | 94.90 | 98.45 | L5 | 14.39 | 0.960 | 1981 | list |
| 4709 Ennomos | 8.5 | 91.433 | 80.85 | 80.03 | L5 | 12.28 | 0.690 | 1988 | list |
| 2797 Teucer | 8.7 | 89.430 | 111.14 | 113.99 | L4 | 10.15 | 0.920 | 1981 | list |
| 2920 Automedon | 8.8 | 88.574 | 111.01 | 113.11 | L4 | 10.21 | 0.950 | 1981 | list |
| 15436 Dexius | 9.1 | 87.646 | 85.71 | 78.63 | L4 | 8.97 | 0.870 | 1998 | list |
| 3596 Meriones | 9.2 | 87.380 | 75.09 | 73.28 | L4 | 12.96 | 0.830 | 1985 | list |
| 2893 Peiroos | 9.23 | 86.884 | 87.46 | 86.76 | L5 | 8.96 | 0.950 | 1975 | list |
| 4086 Podalirius | 9.1 | 85.495 | 86.89 | 85.98 | L4 | 10.43 | 0.870 | 1985 | list |
| 4060 Deipylos | 9.3 | 84.043 | 79.21 | 86.79 | L4 | 9.30 | 0.760 | 1987 | list |
| 1404 Ajax | 9.3 | 83.990 | 81.69 | 96.34 | L4 | 29.38 | 0.960 | 1936 | list |
| 4348 Poulydamas | 9.5 | 82.032 | 70.08 | 87.51 | L5 | 9.91 | 0.840 | 1988 | list |
| 5144 Achates | 9.0 | 80.958 | 91.91 | 89.85 | L5 | 5.96 | 0.920 | 1991 | list |
| 4833 Meges | 8.9 | 80.165 | 87.33 | 89.39 | L4 | 14.25 | 0.940 | 1989 | list |
| 2223 Sarpedon | 9.41 | 77.480 | 94.63 | 108.21 | L5 | 22.74 | 0.880 | 1977 | list |
| 4489 Dracius | 9.0 | 76.595 | 92.93 | 95.02 | L4 | 12.58 | 0.950 | 1988 | list |
| 2260 Neoptolemus | 9.31 | 76.435 | 71.65 | 81.28 | L4 | 8.18 | 0.950 | 1975 | list |
| 5254 Ulysses | 9.2 | 76.147 | 78.34 | 80.00 | L4 | 28.72 | 0.970 | 1986 | list |
| 3708 Socus | 9.3 | 75.661 | 79.59 | 76.75 | L5 | 6.55 | 0.980 | 1974 | list |
| 2674 Pandarus | 9.1 | 74.267 | 98.10 | 101.72 | L5 | 8.48 | 1.000 | 1982 | list |
| 3564 Talthybius | 9.4 | 73.730 | 68.92 | 74.11 | L4 | 40.59 | 0.900 | 1985 | list |
| 4834 Thoas | 9.1 | 72.331 | 86.82 | 96.21 | L4 | 18.19 | 0.950 | 1989 | list |
| 7641 Cteatus | 9.4 | 71.839 | 68.97 | 75.28 | L4 | 27.77 | 0.980 | 1986 | list |
| 3540 Protesilaos | 9.3 | 70.225 | 76.84 | 87.66 | L4 | 8.95 | 0.940 | 1973 | list |
| 11395 Iphinous | 9.8 | 68.977 | 64.71 | 67.78 | L4 | 17.38 | – | 1998 | list |
| 4035 Thestor | 9.6 | 68.733 | 68.23 | 66.99 | L4 | 13.47 | 0.970 | 1986 | list |
| 5264 Telephus | 9.4 | 68.472 | 73.26 | 81.38 | L4 | 9.53 | 0.970 | 1991 | list |
| 1868 Thersites | 9.5 | 68.163 | 70.08 | 78.89 | L4 | 10.48 | 0.960 | 1960 | list |
| 9799 Thronium | 9.6 | 68.033 | 64.87 | 72.42 | L4 | 21.52 | 0.910 | 1996 | list |
| 4068 Menestheus | 9.5 | 67.625 | 62.37 | 68.46 | L4 | 14.40 | 0.950 | 1973 | list |
| 23135 Pheidas | 9.9 | 66.230 | 58.29 | 68.50 | L4 | 8.69 | 0.860 | 2000 | list |
| 2456 Palamedes | 9.3 | 65.916 | 91.66 | 99.60 | L4 | 7.24 | 0.920 | 1966 | list |
| 3709 Polypoites | 9.1 | 65.297 | 99.09 | 85.23 | L4 | 10.04 | 1.000 | 1985 | list |
| 1749 Telamon | 9.5 | 64.898 | 81.06 | 69.14 | L4 | 16.98 | 0.970 | 1949 | list |
| 3548 Eurybates | 9.6 | 63.885 | 72.14 | 68.40 | L4 | 8.71 | 0.730 | 1973 | list |
| 4543 Phoinix | 9.7 | 63.836 | 62.79 | 69.54 | L4 | 38.87 | 1.200 | 1989 | list |
| 12444 Prothoon | 9.8 | 63.835 | 64.31 | 62.41 | L5 | 15.82 | – | 1996 | list |
| 4836 Medon | 9.5 | 63.277 | 67.73 | 78.70 | L4 | 9.82 | 0.920 | 1989 | list |
| 16070 Charops | 9.7 | 63.191 | 64.13 | 68.98 | L5 | 20.24 | 0.960 | 1999 | list |
| 15440 Eioneus | 9.6 | 62.519 | 66.48 | 71.88 | L4 | 21.43 | 0.970 | 1998 | list |
| 4715 Medesicaste | 9.7 | 62.097 | 63.91 | 65.93 | L5 | 8.81 | 0.850 | 1989 | list |
| 34746 Thoon | 9.8 | 61.684 | 60.51 | 63.63 | L5 | 19.63 | 0.950 | 2001 | list |
| 38050 Bias | 9.8 | 61.603 | 61.04 | 50.44 | L4 | 18.85 | 0.990 | 1998 | list |
| 5130 Ilioneus | 9.7 | 60.711 | 59.40 | 52.49 | L5 | 14.77 | 0.960 | 1989 | list |
| 5027 Androgeos | 9.6 | 59.786 | 57.86 | n.a. | L4 | 11.38 | 0.910 | 1988 | list |
| 6090 Aulis | 9.4 | 59.568 | 74.53 | 81.92 | L4 | 18.48 | 0.980 | 1989 | list |
| 5648 Axius | 9.7 | 59.295 | 63.91 | n.a. | L5 | 37.56 | 0.900 | 1990 | list |
| 7119 Hiera | 9.7 | 59.150 | 76.40 | 77.29 | L4 | 400 | 0.950 | 1989 | list |
| 4805 Asteropaios | 10.0 | 57.647 | 53.16 | 43.44 | L5 | 12.37 | – | 1990 | list |
| 16974 Iphthime | 9.8 | 57.341 | 55.43 | 57.15 | L4 | 78.9 | 0.960 | 1998 | list |
| 4867 Polites | 9.8 | 57.251 | 58.29 | 64.29 | L5 | 11.24 | 1.010 | 1989 | list |
| 2895 Memnon | 10.0 | 56.706 | 55.67 | n.a. | L5 | 7.50 | 0.710 | 1981 | list |
| 4708 Polydoros | 9.9 | 54.964 | 55.67 | n.a. | L5 | 7.52 | 0.960 | 1988 | list |
| 21601 Aias | 10.0 | 54.909 | 55.67 | 56.08 | L4 | 12.65 | 0.970 | 1998 | list |
| 12929 Periboea | 9.9 | 54.077 | 61.04 | 55.34 | L5 | 9.27 | 0.880 | 1999 | list |
| 17492 Hippasos | 10.0 | 53.975 | 55.67 | n.a. | L5 | 17.75 | – | 1991 | list |
| 5652 Amphimachus | 10.1 | 53.921 | 53.16 | 52.48 | L4 | 8.37 | 1.050 | 1992 | list |
| 2759 Idomeneus | 9.9 | 53.676 | 61.01 | 52.55 | L4 | 32.38 | 0.910 | 1980 | list |
| 5258 Rhoeo | 10.2 | 53.275 | 50.77 | n.a. | L4 | 19.85 | 1.010 | 1989 | list |
| 12126 Chersidamas | 10.1 | 53.202 | n.a. | n.a. | L5 | n.a. | ? | 1999 | list |
| 15502 Hypeirochus | 10.0 | 53.100 | 55.67 | 50.86 | L5 | 15.13 | 0.875 | 1999 | list |
| 4754 Panthoos | 10.0 | 53.025 | 53.15 | 56.96 | L5 | 27.68 | – | 1977 | list |
| 4832 Palinurus | 10.0 | 52.058 | 53.16 | n.a. | L5 | 5.32 | 1.000 | 1988 | list |
| 5126 Achaemenides | 10.5 | 51.922 | 44.22 | 48.57 | L4 | 53.02 | – | 1989 | list |
| 3240 Laocoon | 10.2 | 51.695 | 50.77 | n.a. | L5 | 11.31 | 0.880 | 1978 | list |
| 4902 Thessandrus | 9.8 | 51.263 | 61.04 | 71.79 | L4 | 738 | 0.960 | 1989 | list |
| 11552 Boucolion | 10.1 | 51.136 | 53.16 | 53.91 | L5 | 32.44 | – | 1993 | list |
| 20729 Opheltius | 10.4 | 50.961 | 46.30 | n.a. | L4 | 5.72 | 1.000 | 1999 | list |
| 6545 Leitus | 10.1 | 50.951 | 53.16 | n.a. | L4 | 16.26 | 0.910 | 1986 | list |
| 4792 Lykaon | 10.1 | 50.870 | 53.16 | n.a. | L5 | 40.09 | 0.960 | 1988 | list |
| 21900 Orus | 10.0 | 50.810 | 55.67 | 53.87 | L4 | 13.45 | 0.950 | 1999 | list |
| 1873 Agenor | 10.1 | 50.799 | 53.76 | 54.38 | L5 | 20.60 | – | 1971 | list |
| 5028 Halaesus | 10.2 | 50.770 | 50.77 | n.a. | L4 | 24.94 | 0.900 | 1988 | list |
| 2146 Stentor | 9.9 | 50.755 | 58.29 | n.a. | L4 | 16.40 | – | 1976 | list |
| 4722 Agelaos | 10.0 | 50.378 | 53.16 | 59.47 | L5 | 18.44 | 0.910 | 1977 | list |
| 5284 Orsilocus | 10.1 | 50.159 | 53.16 | n.a. | L4 | 10.31 | 0.970 | 1989 | list |
| 11509 Thersilochos | 10.1 | 49.960 | 53.16 | 56.23 | L5 | 17.37 | – | 1990 | list |
| 5285 Krethon | 10.1 | 49.606 | 58.53 | 52.61 | L4 | 12.04 | 1.090 | 1989 | list |
| 4791 Iphidamas | 10.1 | 49.528 | 57.85 | 59.96 | L5 | 9.70 | 1.030 | 1988 | list |
| 9023 Mnesthus | 10.1 | 49.151 | 50.77 | 60.80 | L5 | 30.66 | – | 1988 | list |
| 5283 Pyrrhus | 9.7 | 48.356 | 64.58 | 69.93 | L4 | 7.32 | 0.950 | 1989 | list |
| 4946 Askalaphus | 10.2 | 48.209 | 52.71 | 66.10 | L4 | 22.73 | 0.940 | 1988 | list |
| 22149 Cinyras | 10.2 | 48.190 | 50.77 | 50.37 | L4 | 7.84 | 1.090 | 2000 | list |
| 32496 Deïopites | 10.2 | 48.017 | 50.77 | 51.63 | L5 | 23.34 | 0.950 | 2000 | list |
| 5120 Bitias | 10.2 | 47.987 | 50.77 | n.a. | L5 | 15.21 | 0.780 | 1988 | list |
| 12714 Alkimos | 10.1 | 47.819 | 61.04 | 54.62 | L4 | 28.48 | – | 1991 | list |
| 7352 Hypsenor | 9.9 | 47.731 | 55.67 | 47.07 | L5 | 648 | 0.850 | 1994 | list |
| 1870 Glaukos | 10.6 | 47.649 | 42.23 | n.a. | L5 | 5.99 | — | 1971 | list |
| 4138 Kalchas | 10.1 | 46.462 | 53.16 | 61.04 | L4 | 29.2 | 0.810 | 1973 | list |
| 23958 Theronice | 10.2 | 46.001 | 50.77 | 47.91 | L4 | 562 | 0.990 | 1998 | list |
| 4828 Misenus | 10.4 | 45.954 | 46.30 | 43.22 | L5 | 12.87 | 0.920 | 1988 | list |
| 4057 Demophon | 10.1 | 45.683 | 53.16 | n.a. | L4 | 29.82 | 1.060 | 1985 | list |
| 4501 Eurypylos | 10.4 | 45.524 | 46.30 | n.a. | L4 | 6.05 | – | 1989 | list |
| 4007 Euryalos | 10.3 | 45.515 | 48.48 | 53.89 | L4 | 6.39 | – | 1973 | list |
| 5259 Epeigeus | 10.3 | 44.741 | 42.59 | 44.42 | L4 | 18.42 | – | 1989 | list |
| 30705 Idaios | 10.4 | 44.546 | 46.30 | n.a. | L5 | 15.74 | – | 1977 | list |
| 16560 Daitor | 10.7 | 43.861 | 51.42 | 43.38 | L5 | – | – | 1991 | list |
| 15977 Pyraechmes | 10.4 | 43.530 | 46.30 | 51.53 | L5 | 250 | 0.906 | 1998 | list |
| 7543 Prylis | 10.6 | 42.893 | 42.23 | n.a. | L4 | 17.80 | – | 1973 | list |
| 4827 Dares | 10.5 | 42.770 | 44.22 | n.a. | L5 | 19.00 | – | 1988 | list |
| 1647 Menelaus | 10.5 | 42.716 | 44.22 | n.a. | L4 | 17.74 | 0.866 | 1957 | list |
^{(A)} Used sources: WISE/NEOWISE catalog (NEOWISE_DIAM_V1 PDS, Grav, 2012); IRAS data (SIMPS v.6 catalog); and Akari catalog (Usui, 2011); RP: rotation period and V–I (color index) taken from the LCDB Note: missing data was completed with figures from the JPL SBDB (query) and from the LCDB (query form) for the WISE/NEOWISE and SIMPS catalogs, respectively. These figures are given in italics. Also, listing is incomplete above #100.
