= (300163) 2006 VW139 =

Binary main-belt active asteroid

(300163) 2006 VW_{139} 288P/2006 VW_{139}
- Time-lapse video of 2006 VW_{139}

Discovery
- Discovered by: Spacewatch
- Discovery site: Kitt Peak National Obs.
- Discovery date: 15 November 2006

Designations
- Alternative designations: 288P · P/2006 VW_{139}
- Minor planet category: main-belt · (outer) main-belt comet

Orbital characteristics
- Epoch 4 September 2017 (JD 2458000.5)
- Uncertainty parameter 0
- Observation arc: 16.31 yr (5,958 days)
- Aphelion: 3.6619 AU
- Perihelion: 2.4358 AU
- Semi-major axis: 3.0488 AU
- Eccentricity: 0.2011
- Orbital period (sidereal): 5.32 yr (1,944 days)
- Mean anomaly: 55.529°
- Mean motion: 0° 11^{m} 6.36^{s} / day
- Inclination: 3.2402°
- Longitude of ascending node: 83.187°
- Time of perihelion: 28 June 2027
- Argument of perihelion: 281.00°
- Known satellites: 1

Physical characteristics
- Dimensions: 1.8±0.2 km (derived); 3.20 km (calculated)
- Mass: (6.15±4.85)×10^{12} kg (Note: The mass of the primary component(6.15±4.85)×10^{12} kg. The overall mass of the binary system is estimated to be between 1.3×10^{12} kg and 1.1×10^{13} kg.)
- Geometric albedo: 0.057 (assumed)
- Spectral type: C (assumed)
- Absolute magnitude (H): 16.2 · 16.20±0.24

(300163) 2006 VW_{139} (periodic comet designation 288P/2006 VW_{139}) is a binary active asteroid and main-belt comet from the outer regions of the asteroid belt. The object was discovered by Spacewatch in 2006. Its binary nature was confirmed by the Hubble Space Telescope in September 2016. Both the primary and its minor-planet moon are similar in mass and size, making it a true binary system. The components are estimated to measure 1.8 kilometers in diameter, orbiting each other at a wide separation of 104 kilometers every 135 days.

== Discovery ==
2006 VW_{139} was discovered on 15 November 2006, by the Spacewatch survey at Kitt Peak National Observatory near Tucson, Arizona. The possible cometary activity was seen in November 2011 by Pan-STARRS. Both Spacewatch and Pan-STARRS are asteroid survey projects of NASA's Near Earth Object Observations Program. After the Pan-STARRS observations it was also given a comet designation of 288P.

== Orbit and classification ==
2006 VW_{139} is a non-family asteroid of the main-belt's background population. It is both a binary asteroid and a main-belt comet, also known as an "active asteroid". It orbits the Sun in the outer main-belt at a distance of 2.4–3.7 AU once every 5 years and 4 months (1,944 days; semi-major axis of 3.05 AU). Its orbit has an eccentricity of 0.20 and an inclination of 3° with respect to the ecliptic.

The body's observation arc begins in September 2000, with a precovery taken by the Sloan Digital Sky Survey at Apache Point Observatory, New Mexico, more than six years prior to its official discovery observation by Spacewatch at Kitt Peak.

=== First binary main-belt comet ===
2006 VW_{139} was first observed by the Hubble Space Telescope (HST) in December 2011. It was imaged by HST in September 2016, just before it made its closest approach to the Sun and confirmed its binary nature with two asteroids orbiting each other, and revealed ongoing cometary activity. This makes the object the first known binary asteroid that is also classified as a main-belt comet. The binary is thought to be the result of fission of the precursor caused by YORP-driven spinup.

Observations of the HST revealed ongoing activity in this binary system. The combined features of this binary asteroid - wide separation, near-equal component size, high eccentricity orbit, and comet-like activity also make it unique among the few known binary asteroids that have a wide separation.

== Physical characteristics ==
=== Diameter, albedo, and mass ===
2006 VW_{139} has a derived diameter of 1.8±0.2 kilometer. The Collaborative Asteroid Lightcurve Link assumes an albedo of 0.057 and calculates a diameter of 3.20 kilometers based on an absolute magnitude of 16.2. The binary system has an estimated mass between 1.3×10^{12} kg and 1.1×10^{13} kg. A single component has a derived mass of (6.15±4.85)×10^{12} kg.

== Numbering and naming ==
This minor planet was numbered by the Minor Planet Center on 12 October 2011 (M.P.C. 76600). As of 2020, it has not been named.

== See also ==
- 483P/PanSTARRS – Pair of main-belt comets thought to have recently split apart
- (458271) 2010 UM_{26} and (796785) 2010 RN_{221} – Pair of main-belt asteroids thought to have recently dissociated from a binary system
