= Memmia gens =

Families in ancient Rome who shared the Memmius nomen

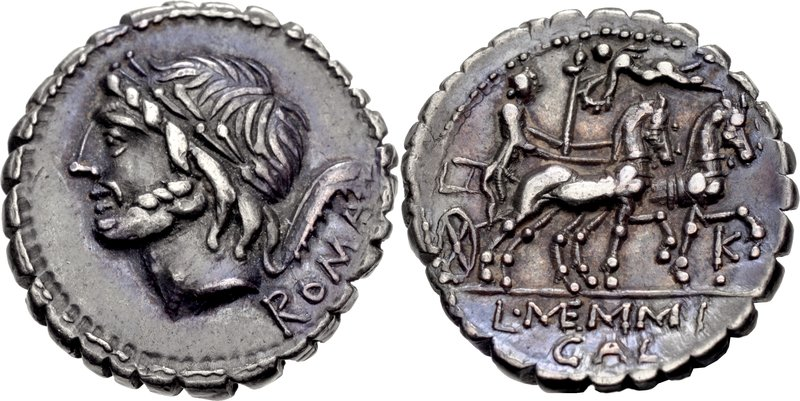
Denarius of Lucius Memmius, 106 BC. The reverse depicts Venus driving a chariot, with Cupid flying above, alluding to the Trojan ancestry claimed by the Memmii.

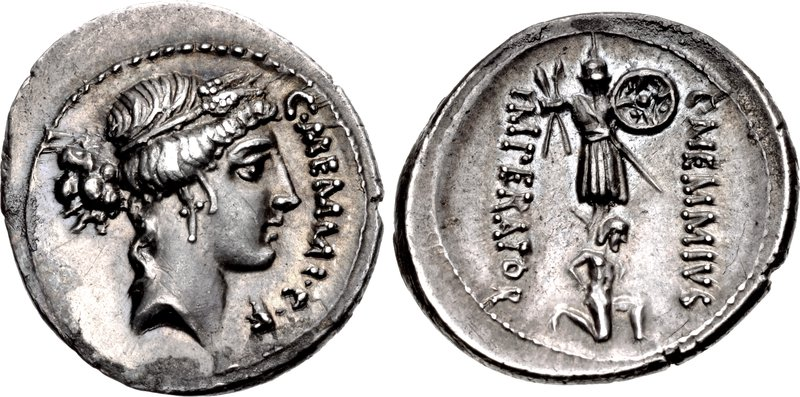
Denarius of Gaius Memmius, 56 BC. Ceres appears on the obverse, while the reverse features a trophy with a prisoner beneath, and the legend Imperator, commemorating Gaius' father, recently propraetor.

The gens Memmia was a plebeian family at ancient Rome. The first member of the gens to achieve prominence was Gaius Memmius Gallus, praetor in 172 BC. From the period of the Jugurthine War to the age of Augustus they contributed numerous tribunes to the Republic.

== Origin ==
The poet Vergil linked the family of the Memmii with the Trojan hero Mnestheus. This late tradition suggests that by the end of the Republic, the gens had become a conspicuous part of the Roman nobility. The nomen Memmius is classified by Chase with those gentilicia that either originated at Rome, or cannot be shown to have come from anywhere else. From its morphology, the name could be derived from a cognomen, Memmus, the significance of which is unknown. The use of Quirinus, a Sabine deity, on the denarii of Gaius Memmius in 56 BC, perhaps alludes to a Sabine origin of the gens.

== Praenomina ==
The main praenomina of the Memmii were Gaius, Lucius, Quintus, and Publius. There is also at least one example of Titus.

== Branches and cognomina ==
The Memmii of the Republic did not possess hereditary surnames, but two distinct families are identifiable by their respective voting tribes, the Galeria and the Menenia. They did nevertheless use a number of personal cognomina, including Quirinus, thought to have been the name of a Sabine god, who came to be equated with both Janus and Romulus; Gallus, referring to a cockerel, or perhaps to a Gaul; and Geminus, traditionally given to a twin. Other cognomina are found in imperial times, including Maximus, given to an eldest brother, or someone particularly notable; Regulus, a diminutive of rex, a king, used by a number of old Roman families; Pollio, a polisher, particularly of armour; Afer, referring to the province of Africa; and Senecio, a diminutive of senex, an old man.

== Members ==
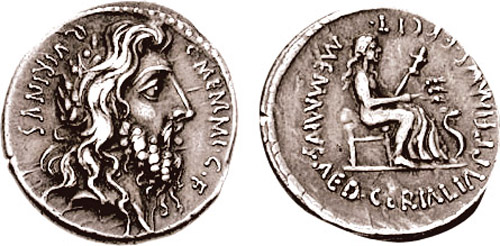
Denarius of Gaius Memmius, 56 BC. The obverse probably depicts Quirinus; on the reverse is Ceres, alluding to Gaius Memmius Quirinus, who established the Ludi Ceriales.

This list includes abbreviated praenomina. For an explanation of this practice, see filiation.

- Gaius Memmius C. f. Quirinus, plebeian aedile prior to 210 BC, was the first to exhibit the Cerealia at Rome.
- Gaius Memmius Gallus, praetor in 172 BC, obtained Sicily as his province.
- Titus Memmius, commissioner sent by the senate to hear the complaints of the Achaeans and Macedonians against the Roman magistrates, in 170 BC.
- Quintus Memmius, legate sent by the senate to the Jews circa 164 BC.
- Lucius Memmius C. f., a senator in 129 BC, perhaps the son of Gaius Memmius, the praetor of 172. He was probably the senator who visited Egypt in 112 BC.
- Gaius Memmius, nicknamed Mordax, was tribune of the plebs in 111 BC. A candidate in 100 for the consulship, he was bludgeoned to death by the supporters of Saturninus and Glaucia.
- Lucius Memmius, triumvir monetalis circa 109 BC, brother of Gaius Memmius, the tribune of the plebs of 111. Cicero describes them as mediocre but aggressive orators. He was also a supporter of Marcus Livius Drusus and his daughter married Gaius Scribonius Curio, the consul of 76.
- Memmia L. f., wife of Gaius Scribonius Curio.
- Lucius Memmius, triumvir monetalis in 106 BC, pictured Venus on his denarii, an allusion to the gens' claim of Trojan descent. (Note: The legend GAL on his coins refers to his tribe, Galeria, and is not a cognomen; he used it to distinguish himself from Lucius Memmius, the moneyer of 109.)
- Gaius Memmius L. f., triumvir monetalis in 87 BC, together with his brother, Lucius. (Note: Evidently the sons of Lucius Memmius, the moneyer of 106, since they reused the design of his coins, as well as mentioning the tribus Galeria.)
- Lucius Memmius L. f., triumvir monetalis in 87 BC, together with his brother, Gaius.
- Gaius Memmius (C. f.), married a sister of Gnaeus Pompeius, under whom he served in Sicily in 81 BC, and later in Hispania, where he died in 75. He was probably the son of Gaius Memmius, the tribune of 111.
- Publius Memmius, a witness for the defense at the trial of Aulus Caecina in 69 BC.
- Gaius Memmius L. f. Geminus, son of Lucius Memmius, the triumvir monetalis of 109 BC, was an eloquent speaker and poet. He was tribune of the plebs in 66 BC, praetor in 58, and propraetor in Bithynia and Pontus the following year. He was the first husband of Fausta Cornelia, the daughter of Sulla.
- Gaius Memmius C. f. L. n., triumvir monetalis in 56 BC, tribune of the plebs in 54 BC, prosecuted various officials for corruption; he was consul suffectus in 34 BC, and exhibited games in honour of Venus Genetrix.
- Lucius Memmius C. f. L. n., of the tribe Galeria, a tribune of the plebs at an uncertain date, distributed lands to the veterans of the 7th and 26th legions in 41 BC.
- Publius Memmius P. f. Regulus, consul suffectus ex Kal. Oct. in AD 31, and subsequently governor of Macedonia, was the first husband of Lollia Paulina, afterwards the empress of Caligula, who compelled them to divorce so that he could marry her.
- Lucius Memmius Pollio, (Note: Or possibly Mammius.) consul suffectus in AD 49.
- Gaius Memmius Regulus, probably the son of Publius Regulus, was consul in AD 63.
- Senecio Memmius Afer, consul suffectus in AD 99.
- Lucius Memmius Tuscillus Senecio, son of the consul of AD 99.
- Memmius Vitrasius Orfitus, praefectus urbi from 353 to 355, and 357 to 359.
- Quintus Aurelius Memmius Symmachus, consul in AD 485.

== See also ==
- List of Roman gentes

== Bibliography ==
- Lucius Cornelius Sisenna, Historiae.
- Marcus Tullius Cicero, Brutus, De Oratore, Epistulae ad Quintum Fratrem, In Catilinam, Pro Balbo, Pro Caecina, Pro Fonteio, Pro Gaio Rabirio Postumo.
- Gaius Sallustius Crispus (Sallust), Bellum Jugurthinum (The Jugurthine War).
- Titus Livius (Livy), History of Rome.
- Valerius Maximus, Factorum ac Dictorum Memorabilium (Memorable Facts and Sayings).
- Marcus Fabius Quintilianus (Quintilian), Institutio Oratoria (Institutes of Oratory).
- Publius Cornelius Tacitus, Annales.
- Plutarchus, Lives of the Noble Greeks and Romans.
- Gaius Suetonius Tranquillus, De Vita Caesarum (Lives of the Caesars, or The Twelve Caesars).
- Lucius Annaeus Florus, Epitome de T. Livio Bellorum Omnium Annorum DCC (Epitome of Livy: All the Wars of Seven Hundred Years).
- Appianus Alexandrinus (Appian), Bellum Civile (The Civil War).
- Lucius Cassius Dio Cocceianus (Cassius Dio), Roman History.
- Paulus Orosius, Historiarum Adversum Paganos (History Against the Pagans).
- Jan Gruter, Inscriptiones Antiquae Totius Orbis Romani (Ancient Inscriptions from the Whole Roman World), Heidelberg (1603).
- Dictionary of Greek and Roman Biography and Mythology, William Smith, ed., Little, Brown and Company, Boston (1849).
- George Davis Chase, "The Origin of Roman Praenomina", in Harvard Studies in Classical Philology, vol. VIII, pp. 103–184 (1897).
- Paul von Rohden, Elimar Klebs, & Hermann Dessau, Prosopographia Imperii Romani (The Prosopography of the Roman Empire, abbreviated PIR), Berlin (1898).
- T. Robert S. Broughton, The Magistrates of the Roman Republic, American Philological Association (1952).
- Michel Crawford & Timothy Peter Wiseman, "The Coinage of the Age of Sulla", in The Numismatic Chronicle and Journal of the Royal Numismatic Society, Seventh Series, Vol. 4 (1964), pp. 141–158, Appendix II, pp. 156, 157.
- Robert K. Sherk, "The Text of the Senatus Consultum De Agro Pergameno", in Greek, Roman, and Byzantine Studies, vol. 7, pp. 361–369 (1966).
- T. P. Wiseman, "Lucius Memmius and His Family" in Classical Quarterly, Vol. 17, No. 1 (May 1967), pp. 164–167.
- John C. Traupman, The New College Latin & English Dictionary, Bantam Books, New York (1995).
- Michael Crawford, Roman Republican Coinage, Cambridge University Press (1974, 2001).
- A. H. M. Jones & J. R. Martindale, The Prosopography of the Later Roman Empire (abbreviated PLRE), Cambridge University Press (1971–1992).
- Taylor, Lily Ross, The Voting Districts of the Roman Republic: The Thirty-five Urban and Rural Tribes, ed. Jerzy Linderski, Ann Arbor: University of Michigan Press (2013, 1960), ISBN 978-0-472-11869-4.
