= Mnestheus =

Character in the Aeneid

Mnestheus (Ancient Greek: Μνησθεύς, lit. 'mindful' or 'remembrance') is a character from Roman mythology, found in Virgil's Aeneid. He is described by Virgil as the ancestral hero of the Memmii and "Of the house of Assaracus". One of a handful of vaguely defined lieutenants under Aeneas, he appears to be Aeneas's most senior captain, taking charge in Book 9 in his absence. He takes second place in the boat race during the funeral games of Anchises in Book 5.

== See also ==
- 9023 Mnesthus, Jovian asteroid named after Mnestheus
- Mnestheus (skipper), a genus of butterflies
