= Aeneads =

In Roman mythology, the friends, family and companions of Aeneas

This is for the mythical allies of Aeneas. For the story written about them by Virgil, see Aeneid

In Roman mythology, the Aeneads (Ancient Greek: Αἰνειάδαι) were the friends, family and companions of Aeneas, with whom they fled from Troy after the Trojan War. Aenides was another patronymic from Aeneas, which is applied by Gaius Valerius Flaccus to the inhabitants of Cyzicus, whose town was believed to have been founded by Cyzicus, the son of Aeneas and Aenete. Similarly, Aeneades (Ancient Greek: Αἰνειάδης) was a patronymic from Aeneas, and applied as a surname to those who were believed to have been descended from him, such as Ascanius, Augustus, and the Romans in general.

The Aeneads included:

- Achates
- Acmon, son of Clytius (son of Aeolus),
- Anchises
- Caeculus
- Creusa, wife of Aeneas and mother of Ascanius
- Ascanius
- Gyas
- Iapyx
- the Lares
- Nisus and Euryalus, heroes of the helmet episode in Book 9
- Mimas
- Misenus, Aeneas' trumpeter
- Mnestheus, possibly Aeneas' most senior commander
- the Penates
- Serestus
- Sergestus
- Achaemenides, one of Odysseus' crew the Aeneads picked up in Sicily (strictly speaking not an Aenead as he was not Trojan, but Greek).

== See also ==
- The Golden Bough (mythology)
- Aeneid
