= 4827 Dares =

Trojan asteroid

Discovery
- Discovered by: C. Shoemaker
- Discovery site: Palomar Obs.
- Discovery date: 17 August 1988

Designations
- Pronunciation: /ˈdɛəriːz/
- Named after: Dares (Greek mythology)
- Alternative designations: 1988 QE
- Minor planet category: Jupiter trojan Trojan · background
- Adjectives: Daretian

Orbital characteristics
- Epoch 23 March 2018 (JD 2458200.5)
- Uncertainty parameter 0
- Observation arc: 63.49 yr (23,191 d)
- Aphelion: 5.3517 AU
- Perihelion: 4.8903 AU
- Semi-major axis: 5.1210 AU
- Eccentricity: 0.0451
- Orbital period (sidereal): 11.59 yr (4,233 d)
- Mean anomaly: 119.05°
- Mean motion: 0° 5^{m} 6.36^{s} / day
- Inclination: 7.7056°
- Longitude of ascending node: 242.04°
- Argument of perihelion: 170.69°
- Jupiter MOID: 0.0037 AU
- T_{Jupiter}: 2.9800

Physical characteristics
- Mean diameter: 42.77±0.26 km 44.22 km (calculated)
- Synodic rotation period: 18.995±0.028 h
- Geometric albedo: 0.057 (assumed); 0.067±0.007
- Spectral type: D (Pan-STARRS); D (SDSS-MOC)
- Absolute magnitude (H): 10.4; 10.5; 10.88±0.01

4827 Dares /ˈdɛəriːz/ is a larger Jupiter trojan from the Trojan camp, approximately 43 kilometers (27 miles) in diameter. It was discovered on 17 August 1988 by American astronomer Carolyn Shoemaker at the Palomar Observatory in California. The dark D-type asteroid has a rotation period of 19.0 hours. It was named after Dares from Greek mythology.

== Orbit and classification ==
Dares is a dark Jovian asteroid in a 1:1 orbital resonance with Jupiter. It is located in the trailering Trojan camp at the Gas Giant's L_{5} Lagrangian point, 60° behind on its orbit. It is also a non-family asteroid of the Jovian background population. It orbits the Sun at a distance of 4.9–5.4 AU once every 11 years and 7 months (4,233 days; semi-major axis of 5.12 AU). Its orbit has an eccentricity of 0.05 and an inclination of 8° with respect to the ecliptic.

The body's observation arc begins with a precovery at Palomar in November 1954, almost 34 years prior to its official discovery observation.

== Physical characteristics ==
In the SDSS-based taxonomy, Dares is a dark D-type asteroid. It is also characterized as a D-type by Pan-STARRS' survey.

=== Rotation period ===
In February 1994, a rotational lightcurve of Dares was obtained over five nights of observation by Stefano Mottola and Anders Erikson using the ESO 1-metre telescope at La Silla Observatory in Chile. Lightcurve analysis showed a well-defined rotation period of 18.995±0.028 hours with a brightness variation of 0.24 magnitude (U=3).

In October 2013, photometric observations in the R-band by astronomers at the Palomar Transient Factory in California gave a concurring period of 18.967 hours with an amplitude of 0.23 magnitude (U=2).

=== Diameter and albedo ===
According to the survey carried out by the NEOWISE mission of NASA's Wide-field Infrared Survey Explorer, Dares measures 42.77 kilometers in diameter and its surface has an albedo of 0.067, while the Collaborative Asteroid Lightcurve Link assumes a standard albedo for a carbonaceous asteroid of 0.057 and calculates a diameter of 44.22 kilometers based on an absolute magnitude of 10.5.

== Naming ==
This minor planet was named by the discoverer from Greek mythology after the Trojan Dares, one of Aeneas' wandering companions (Aeneads) who were not killed or enslaved by the end of the Trojan War. The official naming citation was published by the Minor Planet Center on 25 August 1991 (M.P.C. 18647).
