= Milan Antal =

Slovak astronomer

Minor planets discovered: 17
1807 Slovakia	20 August 1971	list
3393 Štúr	28 November 1984	list
3730 Hurban	4 December 1983	list
4573 Piešťany	5 October 1986	list
5025 Mecisteus	5 October 1986	list
6545 Leitus	5 October 1986	list
7641 Cteatus	5 October 1986	list
9543 Nitra	4 December 1983	list
10293 Pribina	5 October 1986	list
11014 Svätopluk	23 August 1982	list
13916 Bernolák	23 August 1982	list
16435 Fándly	7 November 1988	list
19955 Hollý	28 November 1984	list
20991 Jánkollár	28 November 1984	list
23444 Kukučín	5 October 1986	list
(32773) 1986 TD	5 October 1986	list
(48413) 1986 TB_{7}	9 October 1986	list

Milan Antal (1935–1999) was a Slovak astronomer.

While working at Skalnaté Pleso Observatory and at the Toruń Centre for Astronomy from 1971–1988, he discovered 17 minor planets, including the asteroid 1807 Slovakia and the three unnamed Jupiter trojans (5025) 1986 TS6, (6545) 1986 TR6 and (7641) 1986 TT6. A distinguished observer of comets and minor planets, he has determined exact astrometric positions from photographic plates for many thousands of small Solar System bodies.

The main-belt asteroid 6717 Antal, discovered by German astronomers Freimut Börngen and Lutz Schmadel in 1990, is named in his honour.
