= 11509 Thersilochos =

Trojan asteroid

Discovery
- Discovered by: E. W. Elst
- Discovery site: La Silla Obs.
- Discovery date: 15 November 1990

Designations
- Pronunciation: /θərˈsɪləkəs/
- Named after: Thersilochus (Greek mythology)
- Alternative designations: 1990 VL_{6} · 1989 SN_{7} 1989 VM_{5}
- Minor planet category: Jupiter trojan Trojan · background
- Adjectives: Thersilochian

Orbital characteristics
- Epoch 23 March 2018 (JD 2458200.5)
- Uncertainty parameter 0
- Observation arc: 28.64 yr (10,462 d)
- Aphelion: 5.9165 AU
- Perihelion: 4.4429 AU
- Semi-major axis: 5.1797 AU
- Eccentricity: 0.1422
- Orbital period (sidereal): 11.79 yr (4,306 d)
- Mean anomaly: 182.56°
- Mean motion: 0° 5^{m} 0.96^{s} / day
- Inclination: 18.502°
- Longitude of ascending node: 214.70°
- Argument of perihelion: 128.51°
- Jupiter MOID: 0.0868 AU
- T_{Jupiter}: 2.8780

Physical characteristics
- Mean diameter: 49.96±0.76 km 56.23±4.79 km
- Synodic rotation period: 17.367±0.015 h
- Geometric albedo: 0.051±0.009; 0.065±0.010
- Spectral type: C (assumed)
- Absolute magnitude (H): 10.10; 10.270±0.004 (R)

11509 Thersilochos /θərˈsɪləkəs/ is a Jupiter trojan from the Trojan camp, approximately 50 kilometers (31 miles) in diameter. It was discovered on 15 November 1990, by Belgian astronomer Eric Elst at the La Silla Observatory in northern Chile. The dark Jovian asteroid belongs to the 100 largest Jupiter trojans and has a rotation period of 17.4 hours. It was named after the Trojan warrior Thersilochus from Greek mythology.

== Orbit and classification ==
Thersilochos is a dark Jovian asteroid in a 1:1 orbital resonance with Jupiter. It is located in the trailering Trojan camp at the Gas Giant's L_{5} Lagrangian point, 60° behind its orbit. It is also a non-family asteroid of the Jovian background population. It orbits the Sun at a distance of 4.4–5.9 AU once every 11 years and 9 months (4,306 days; semi-major axis of 5.18 AU). Its orbit has an eccentricity of 0.14 and an inclination of 19° with respect to the ecliptic.

The body's observation arc begins with its first observation as 1989 SN_{7} at Palomar Observatory in September 1989, just two months prior to its official discovery observation at La Silla.

== Physical characteristics ==
Thersilochos is an assumed C-type asteroid, while the majority of the larger Jovian asteroids are D-types.

=== Rotation period ===
In July 2007, a rotational lightcurve of Thersilochos was obtained from a total of six nights of photometric observations by Italian astronomer Stefano Mottola at the Calar Alto Observatory in Spain. Lightcurve analysis gave a well-defined rotation period of 17.367±0.015 hours with a brightness variation of 0.27 magnitude (U=3).

Follow-up observations in the R-band by astronomers at the Palomar Transient Factory in November 2013, and by Daniel Coley at the Center for Solar System Studies in December 2014, gave two concurring periods of 17.329 and 17.389 hours (U=3/2). (Note: Lightcurve plots of (11509) Thersilochos from Dec 2014 by Daniel Coley at the Center for Solar System Studies (U80). Quality code is 3- (lightcurve rating at CS3). Summary figures at the LCDB and CS3.)

=== Diameter and albedo ===
According to the surveys carried out by the Japanese Akari satellite and the NEOWISE mission of NASA's Wide-field Infrared Survey Explorer, Thersilochos between 49.96 and 56.23 kilometers in diameter and its surface has an albedo of 0.065 and 0.051, respectively. The Collaborative Asteroid Lightcurve Link assumes a standard albedo for a carbonaceous asteroid of 0.057 and calculates a diameter of 53.16 kilometers based on an absolute magnitude of 10.1.

100+ largest Jupiter trojans

Largest Jupiter Trojans by survey^{(A)} (mean-diameter in kilometers; RP: rotation period in hours; YoD: Year of Discovery)
Designation	H	WISE	IRAS	Akari	Ln	RP	V–I	YoD	Ref
624 Hektor	7.2	225	233	230.99	L4	6.92	0.930	1907	list
617 Patroclus	8.19	140.362	140.92	140.85	L5	102.80	0.830	1906	list
911 Agamemnon	7.89	131.038	166.66	185.30	L4	6.59	0.980	1919	list
588 Achilles	8.67	130.099	135.47	133.22	L4	7.31	0.940	1906	list
3451 Mentor	8.4	126.288	116.30	117.91	L5	7.70	0.770	1984	list
3317 Paris	8.3	118.790	116.26	120.45	L5	7.09	0.950	1984	list
1867 Deiphobus	8.3	118.220	122.67	131.31	L5	58.66	0.930	1971	list
1172 Äneas	8.33	118.020	142.82	148.66	L5	8.71	0.950	1930	list
1437 Diomedes	8.3	117.786	164.31	172.60	L4	24.49	0.810	1937	list
1143 Odysseus	7.93	114.624	125.64	130.81	L4	10.11	0.860	1930	list
2241 Alcathous	8.64	113.682	114.63	118.87	L5	7.69	0.940	1979	list
659 Nestor	8.99	112.320	108.87	107.06	L4	15.98	0.790	1908	list
3793 Leonteus	8.7	112.046	86.26	87.58	L4	5.62	0.780	1985	list
3063 Makhaon	8.4	111.655	116.14	114.34	L4	8.64	0.830	1983	list
1583 Antilochus	8.6	108.842	101.62	111.69	L4	31.54	0.950	1950	list
884 Priamus	8.81	101.093	96.29	119.99	L5	6.86	0.900	1917	list
1208 Troilus	8.99	100.477	103.34	111.36	L5	56.17	0.740	1931	list
1173 Anchises	8.89	99.549	126.27	120.49	L5	11.60	0.780	1930	list
2207 Antenor	8.89	97.658	85.11	91.32	L5	7.97	0.950	1977	list
2363 Cebriones	9.11	95.976	81.84	84.61	L5	20.05	0.910	1977	list
4063 Euforbo	8.7	95.619	102.46	106.38	L4	8.85	0.950	1989	list
2357 Phereclos	8.94	94.625	94.90	98.45	L5	14.39	0.960	1981	list
4709 Ennomos	8.5	91.433	80.85	80.03	L5	12.28	0.690	1988	list
2797 Teucer	8.7	89.430	111.14	113.99	L4	10.15	0.920	1981	list
2920 Automedon	8.8	88.574	111.01	113.11	L4	10.21	0.950	1981	list
15436 Dexius	9.1	87.646	85.71	78.63	L4	8.97	0.870	1998	list
3596 Meriones	9.2	87.380	75.09	73.28	L4	12.96	0.830	1985	list
2893 Peiroos	9.23	86.884	87.46	86.76	L5	8.96	0.950	1975	list
4086 Podalirius	9.1	85.495	86.89	85.98	L4	10.43	0.870	1985	list
4060 Deipylos	9.3	84.043	79.21	86.79	L4	9.30	0.760	1987	list
1404 Ajax	9.3	83.990	81.69	96.34	L4	29.38	0.960	1936	list
4348 Poulydamas	9.5	82.032	70.08	87.51	L5	9.91	0.840	1988	list
5144 Achates	9.0	80.958	91.91	89.85	L5	5.96	0.920	1991	list
4833 Meges	8.9	80.165	87.33	89.39	L4	14.25	0.940	1989	list
2223 Sarpedon	9.41	77.480	94.63	108.21	L5	22.74	0.880	1977	list
4489 Dracius	9.0	76.595	92.93	95.02	L4	12.58	0.950	1988	list
2260 Neoptolemus	9.31	76.435	71.65	81.28	L4	8.18	0.950	1975	list
5254 Ulysses	9.2	76.147	78.34	80.00	L4	28.72	0.970	1986	list
3708 Socus	9.3	75.661	79.59	76.75	L5	6.55	0.980	1974	list
2674 Pandarus	9.1	74.267	98.10	101.72	L5	8.48	1.000	1982	list
3564 Talthybius	9.4	73.730	68.92	74.11	L4	40.59	0.900	1985	list
4834 Thoas	9.1	72.331	86.82	96.21	L4	18.19	0.950	1989	list
7641 Cteatus	9.4	71.839	68.97	75.28	L4	27.77	0.980	1986	list
3540 Protesilaos	9.3	70.225	76.84	87.66	L4	8.95	0.940	1973	list
11395 Iphinous	9.8	68.977	64.71	67.78	L4	17.38	–	1998	list
4035 Thestor	9.6	68.733	68.23	66.99	L4	13.47	0.970	1986	list
5264 Telephus	9.4	68.472	73.26	81.38	L4	9.53	0.970	1991	list
1868 Thersites	9.5	68.163	70.08	78.89	L4	10.48	0.960	1960	list
9799 Thronium	9.6	68.033	64.87	72.42	L4	21.52	0.910	1996	list
4068 Menestheus	9.5	67.625	62.37	68.46	L4	14.40	0.950	1973	list
23135 Pheidas	9.9	66.230	58.29	68.50	L4	8.69	0.860	2000	list
2456 Palamedes	9.3	65.916	91.66	99.60	L4	7.24	0.920	1966	list
3709 Polypoites	9.1	65.297	99.09	85.23	L4	10.04	1.000	1985	list
1749 Telamon	9.5	64.898	81.06	69.14	L4	16.98	0.970	1949	list
3548 Eurybates	9.6	63.885	72.14	68.40	L4	8.71	0.730	1973	list
4543 Phoinix	9.7	63.836	62.79	69.54	L4	38.87	1.200	1989	list
12444 Prothoon	9.8	63.835	64.31	62.41	L5	15.82	–	1996	list
4836 Medon	9.5	63.277	67.73	78.70	L4	9.82	0.920	1989	list
16070 Charops	9.7	63.191	64.13	68.98	L5	20.24	0.960	1999	list
15440 Eioneus	9.6	62.519	66.48	71.88	L4	21.43	0.970	1998	list
4715 Medesicaste	9.7	62.097	63.91	65.93	L5	8.81	0.850	1989	list
34746 Thoon	9.8	61.684	60.51	63.63	L5	19.63	0.950	2001	list
38050 Bias	9.8	61.603	61.04	50.44	L4	18.85	0.990	1998	list
5130 Ilioneus	9.7	60.711	59.40	52.49	L5	14.77	0.960	1989	list
5027 Androgeos	9.6	59.786	57.86	n.a.	L4	11.38	0.910	1988	list
6090 Aulis	9.4	59.568	74.53	81.92	L4	18.48	0.980	1989	list
5648 Axius	9.7	59.295	63.91	n.a.	L5	37.56	0.900	1990	list
7119 Hiera	9.7	59.150	76.40	77.29	L4	400	0.950	1989	list
4805 Asteropaios	10.0	57.647	53.16	43.44	L5	12.37	–	1990	list
16974 Iphthime	9.8	57.341	55.43	57.15	L4	78.9	0.960	1998	list
4867 Polites	9.8	57.251	58.29	64.29	L5	11.24	1.010	1989	list
2895 Memnon	10.0	56.706	55.67	n.a.	L5	7.50	0.710	1981	list
4708 Polydoros	9.9	54.964	55.67	n.a.	L5	7.52	0.960	1988	list
21601 Aias	10.0	54.909	55.67	56.08	L4	12.65	0.970	1998	list
12929 Periboea	9.9	54.077	61.04	55.34	L5	9.27	0.880	1999	list
17492 Hippasos	10.0	53.975	55.67	n.a.	L5	17.75	–	1991	list
5652 Amphimachus	10.1	53.921	53.16	52.48	L4	8.37	1.050	1992	list
2759 Idomeneus	9.9	53.676	61.01	52.55	L4	32.38	0.910	1980	list
5258 Rhoeo	10.2	53.275	50.77	n.a.	L4	19.85	1.010	1989	list
12126 Chersidamas	10.1	53.202	n.a.	n.a.	L5	n.a.	?	1999	list
15502 Hypeirochus	10.0	53.100	55.67	50.86	L5	15.13	0.875	1999	list
4754 Panthoos	10.0	53.025	53.15	56.96	L5	27.68	–	1977	list
4832 Palinurus	10.0	52.058	53.16	n.a.	L5	5.32	1.000	1988	list
5126 Achaemenides	10.5	51.922	44.22	48.57	L4	53.02	–	1989	list
3240 Laocoon	10.2	51.695	50.77	n.a.	L5	11.31	0.880	1978	list
4902 Thessandrus	9.8	51.263	61.04	71.79	L4	738	0.960	1989	list
11552 Boucolion	10.1	51.136	53.16	53.91	L5	32.44	–	1993	list
20729 Opheltius	10.4	50.961	46.30	n.a.	L4	5.72	1.000	1999	list
6545 Leitus	10.1	50.951	53.16	n.a.	L4	16.26	0.910	1986	list
4792 Lykaon	10.1	50.870	53.16	n.a.	L5	40.09	0.960	1988	list
21900 Orus	10.0	50.810	55.67	53.87	L4	13.45	0.950	1999	list
1873 Agenor	10.1	50.799	53.76	54.38	L5	20.60	–	1971	list
5028 Halaesus	10.2	50.770	50.77	n.a.	L4	24.94	0.900	1988	list
2146 Stentor	9.9	50.755	58.29	n.a.	L4	16.40	–	1976	list
4722 Agelaos	10.0	50.378	53.16	59.47	L5	18.44	0.910	1977	list
5284 Orsilocus	10.1	50.159	53.16	n.a.	L4	10.31	0.970	1989	list
11509 Thersilochos	10.1	49.960	53.16	56.23	L5	17.37	–	1990	list
5285 Krethon	10.1	49.606	58.53	52.61	L4	12.04	1.090	1989	list
4791 Iphidamas	10.1	49.528	57.85	59.96	L5	9.70	1.030	1988	list
9023 Mnesthus	10.1	49.151	50.77	60.80	L5	30.66	–	1988	list
5283 Pyrrhus	9.7	48.356	64.58	69.93	L4	7.32	0.950	1989	list
4946 Askalaphus	10.2	48.209	52.71	66.10	L4	22.73	0.940	1988	list
22149 Cinyras	10.2	48.190	50.77	50.37	L4	7.84	1.090	2000	list
32496 Deïopites	10.2	48.017	50.77	51.63	L5	23.34	0.950	2000	list
5120 Bitias	10.2	47.987	50.77	n.a.	L5	15.21	0.780	1988	list
12714 Alkimos	10.1	47.819	61.04	54.62	L4	28.48	–	1991	list
7352 Hypsenor	9.9	47.731	55.67	47.07	L5	648	0.850	1994	list
1870 Glaukos	10.6	47.649	42.23	n.a.	L5	5.99	—	1971	list
4138 Kalchas	10.1	46.462	53.16	61.04	L4	29.2	0.810	1973	list
23958 Theronice	10.2	46.001	50.77	47.91	L4	562	0.990	1998	list
4828 Misenus	10.4	45.954	46.30	43.22	L5	12.87	0.920	1988	list
4057 Demophon	10.1	45.683	53.16	n.a.	L4	29.82	1.060	1985	list
4501 Eurypylos	10.4	45.524	46.30	n.a.	L4	6.05	–	1989	list
4007 Euryalos	10.3	45.515	48.48	53.89	L4	6.39	–	1973	list
5259 Epeigeus	10.3	44.741	42.59	44.42	L4	18.42	–	1989	list
30705 Idaios	10.4	44.546	46.30	n.a.	L5	15.74	–	1977	list
16560 Daitor	10.7	43.861	51.42	43.38	L5	–	–	1991	list
15977 Pyraechmes	10.4	43.530	46.30	51.53	L5	250	0.906	1998	list
7543 Prylis	10.6	42.893	42.23	n.a.	L4	17.80	–	1973	list
4827 Dares	10.5	42.770	44.22	n.a.	L5	19.00	–	1988	list
1647 Menelaus	10.5	42.716	44.22	n.a.	L4	17.74	0.866	1957	list
^{(A)} Used sources: WISE/NEOWISE catalog (NEOWISE_DIAM_V1 PDS, Grav, 2012); IRAS data (SIMPS v.6 catalog); and Akari catalog (Usui, 2011); RP: rotation period and V–I (color index) taken from the LCDB Note: missing data was completed with figures from the JPL SBDB (query) and from the LCDB (query form) for the WISE/NEOWISE and SIMPS catalogs, respectively. These figures are given in italics. Also, listing is incomplete above #100.

== Naming ==
This minor planet was named from Greek mythology after the Trojan warrior Thersilochus, who fought with Hector at the battle for the dead body of Patroclus and was later slain by Achilles. The official naming citation was published by the Minor Planet Center on 6 January 2003 (M.P.C. 47299).
