= Stentor =

Herald of the Greek forces during the Trojan War

In Greek mythology, Stentor (Ancient Greek: Στέντωρ, romanized: Sténtōr, lit. 'roarer') was a herald of the Greek forces during the Trojan War.

== Mythology ==
Stentor is mentioned briefly in Homer's Iliad in which Hera, in the guise of Stentor, whose "voice was as powerful as fifty voices of other men", encourages the Greeks to fight.

Some versions of the Iliad included Stentor in the Catalogue of Ships as an Arcadian. Elsewhere, he is said to have been a Thracian who died after challenging Hermes to a shouting contest and losing. This explains why Stentor disappears from the rest of the poem.

Stentor's story is the origin of the term "stentorian", meaning loud-voiced, for which he was famous. Aristotle uses the concept in his Politics Book 7, Chapter IV saying, "For who can be the general of such a vast multitude, or who the herald, unless he have the voice of a Stentor?"

== See also ==
- List of Trojan War characters

== Bibliography ==
- Homer, Iliad with an English Translation by A.T. Murray, Ph.D. in two volumes. Cambridge, MA., Harvard University Press; London, William Heinemann, 1924. ISBN 978-0674995796. Online version at the Perseus Digital Library.
- Homer, Homeri Opera in five volumes. Oxford, Oxford University Press. 1920. ISBN 978-0198145318. Greek text available at the Perseus Digital Library.
- Nünlist, René (1 October 2006). "Stentor". In Cancik, Hubert; Schneider, Helmuth (eds.). Brill's New Pauly. Translated by Christine F. Salazar. Basle: Brill Reference Online. ISSN 1574-9347.
