= Iphinous =

In Greek mythology, Iphinous (Ancient Greek: Ἰφίνοος), Iphínoos may refer to the following personages:

- Iphinous, one of the centaurs who fought against the Lapiths at Pirithous' wedding. He was slain with a sword by Peleus during the said battle.
- Iphinous, son of Dexius and an Achaean soldier who participated in the Trojan War. He was killed by Glaucus, son of Hippolochus, during the siege of Troy. The Lycian leader hurled a spear at Iphinous' shoulder as he sprung to the latter's chariot behind his horses causing him to fell from the car to the ground.
- Iphinous, defender of Thebes against the Seven Against Thebes. He was killed by the Argive seer, Amphiaraus.

== See also ==
- Naming citation for Jovian asteroid 11395 Iphinous
