= 21900 Orus =

Trojan asteroid

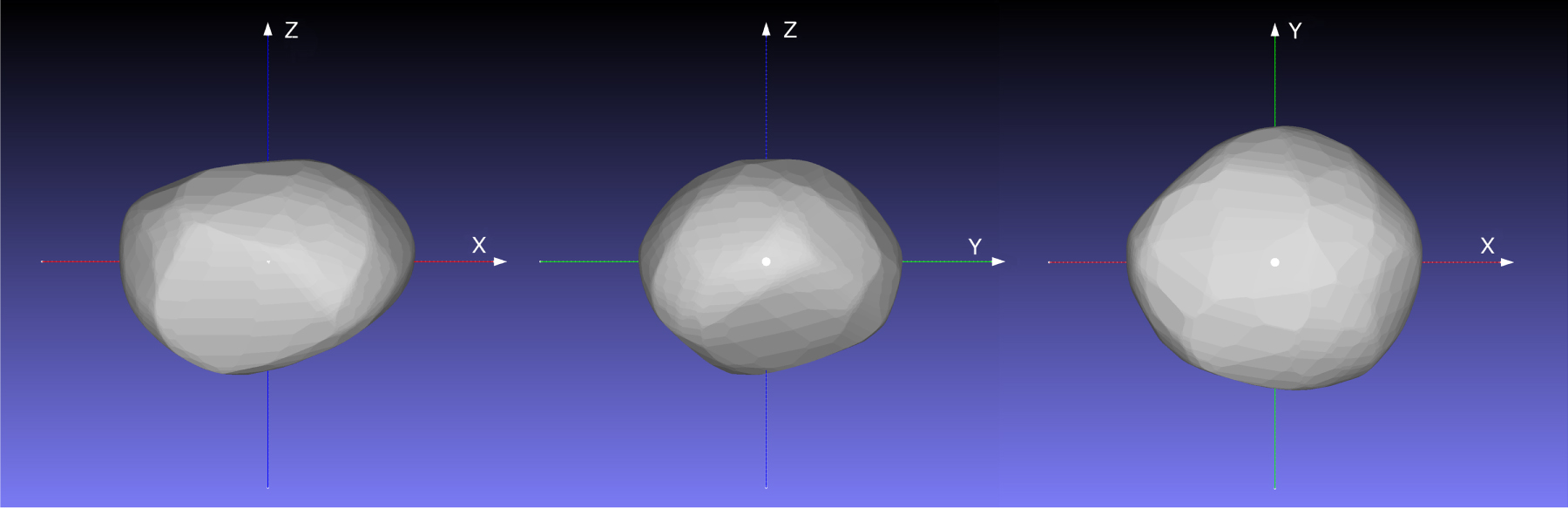
- Shape model of Orus viewed from multiple orthogonal perspectives

Discovery
- Discovered by: T. Kobayashi
- Discovery site: Ōizumi Obs.
- Discovery date: 9 November 1999

Designations
- Pronunciation: /ˈɔːrəs/
- Named after: Orus (Greek mythology)
- Alternative designations: 1999 VQ_{10} · 1998 VD_{18}
- Minor planet category: Jupiter trojan Greek · background
- Adjectives: Orian

Orbital characteristics
- Epoch 25 February 2023 (JD 2460000.5)
- Uncertainty parameter 0
- Earliest precovery date: 8 November 1951
- Aphelion: 5.124 AU
- Perihelion: 4.930 AU
- Semi-major axis: 5.318 AU
- Eccentricity: 0.0379
- Orbital period (sidereal): 11.60 yr (4,237 d)
- Mean anomaly: 356.275°
- Mean motion: 0° 5^{m} 5.892^{s} / day
- Inclination: 8.469°
- Longitude of ascending node: 258.554°
- Argument of perihelion: 181.258°
- Jupiter MOID: 0.0218 AU
- T_{Jupiter}: 2.977

Physical characteristics
- Dimensions: 70.7 × 63.0 × 51.4 km
- Mean diameter: 60.5±0.9 km (area equivalent)
- Synodic rotation period: 13.486190±0.000017 h
- Axial tilt: 149° (wrt ecliptic); 154° (wrt orbit)
- Pole ecliptic longitude: 33°
- Pole ecliptic latitude: −59°
- Geometric albedo: 0.040±0.002
- Spectral type: C · D B–V = 0.799±0.031; V–R = 0.454±0.021
- Absolute magnitude (H): 10.204±0.006

21900 Orus /ˈɔːrəs/ is a Jupiter trojan asteroid from the Greek camp, approximately 53 kilometers (33 miles) in diameter, and a target of the Lucy mission to be visited in November 2028. It is among the 100 largest Jupiter trojans and has a rotation period of 13.5 hours. It was discovered on 9 November 1999, by Japanese amateur astronomer Takao Kobayashi at his private Ōizumi Observatory in Gunma Prefecture, Japan, and later named Orus after a slain Achaean warrior from the Iliad.

== Orbit and classification ==
Animation of Lucy's trajectory around Sun Lucy · Sun · Earth · 52246 Donaldjohanson · 3548 Eurybates · 21900 Orus · 617 Patroclus

Orus is a dark Jupiter trojan asteroid orbiting in the leading Greek camp at Jupiter's L_{4} Lagrangian point, 60° ahead of its orbit in a 1:1 resonance. It is also a non-family asteroid in the Jovian background population.

It orbits the Sun at a distance of 4.9–5.3 AU once every 11 years and 7 months (4,240 days; semi-major axis of 5.13 AU). Its orbit has an eccentricity of 0.04 and an inclination of 8° with respect to the ecliptic. The body's observation arc begins with a precovery, published by the Digitized Sky Survey and taken at Palomar Observatory in November 1951, or 48 years prior to its official discovery observation.

== Lucy mission target ==
Orus is planned to be visited by the Lucy spacecraft which was launched in 2021. The flyby is scheduled for 11 November 2028, and will approach the asteroid to a distance of 1,000 km (620 mi) at a relative velocity of 7.1 km/s (16,000 mph).

== Physical characteristics ==
Orus is characterized as a D-type and C-type asteroid by the Lucy mission team and by Pan-STARRS photometric survey, respectively. It has a V–I color index of 0.95, seem among most larger D-type Jupiter trojans.

=== Lightcurve ===
The first photometric observations of Orus have been made in October 2009, by astronomer Stefano Mottola in a photometric lightcurve survey of 80 Jupiter trojans, using the 1.2-meter telescope at Calar Alto Observatory. The obtained rotational lightcurve rendered a period of 13.45±0.08 hours with a brightness variation of 0.18 magnitude (U=2).

In 2016, Mottola published a revised rotation period of 13.48617±0.00007 h, from ground-based observations taken over five apparitions in support of the Lucy mission. He finds that Orus is a retrograde rotator. The lightcurve suggests the presence of a large crater in the proximity of its north pole.

=== Diameter and albedo ===
According to the surveys carried out by the Japanese Akari satellite and the NEOWISE mission of NASA's Wide-field Infrared Survey Explorer, the body has an albedo of 0.083 and 0.075, with a diameter of 53.87 and 50.81 kilometers, respectively. The Collaborative Asteroid Lightcurve Link assumes a standard albedo for carbonaceous C-type asteroids of 0.057 and calculates a diameter of 55.67 kilometers with an absolute magnitude of 10.0.

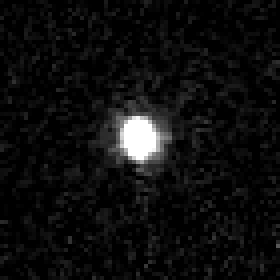
Orus imaged by the Hubble Space Telescope in 2018

== Naming ==
This minor planet was named from Greek mythology after Orus, an Achaean warrior in Homer's Iliad. He was killed in the Trojan War by the Trojan prince Hector, after whom the largest Jupiter trojan 624 Hektor is named. The approved naming citation was published by the Minor Planet Center on 22 February 2016 (M.P.C. 98711).

== Possible satellite ==
Orus has a candidate satellite, detected while searching through Hubble images taken on 7–8 August 2018. Further observations are needed to determine physical characteristics of the satellite, which can help measure the mass of the primary.

== See also ==
- Discovery program
