= Oeceus =

In Greek mythology, Oeceus or Oiceus (Ancient Greek: Οἰκιάδαο) was a king of Olenus. According to Callimachus, he was father of his successor Dexamenus, the father of Theronice, Theraephone, Eurypylus, and Deianira, also known as Mnesimache or Hippolyte.
