= Thalpius (mythology) =

In Greek mythology, Thalpius (Ancient Greek: Θάλπιος means "warmth, heat") was one of the Epeian leaders during the Trojan War along with his cousin Amphimachus.

== Family ==
Thalpius was the son of the Molionid Eurytus and Theraephone, daughter of King Dexamenus of Olenus.

== Mythology ==
As one of the Suitors of Helen and the Achaean Leaders, Thalpius went to Troy leading 20 ships along with Amphimachus. He was also counted among those warriors who hid inside the Wooden Horse.
