= Amphimachus I of Elis =

In Greek mythology, Amphimachus (/æmˈfɪməkəs/; Ancient Greek: Ἀμφίμαχος derived from ἀμφί amphi "on both sides, in all directions, surrounding" and μάχη mache "battle") was one of the leaders of the Elean contingent at the Trojan War.

== Family ==
Amphimachus was the son of Cteatus (son of Actor) and Theronice, daughter of Dexamenus.

== Mythology ==
Amphimachus brought 40 ships to Troy together with other leaders from Elis, including Thalpius, Diores and Polyxenus:

And they that dwelt in Buprasium and goodly Elis, all that part thereof that Hyrmine and Myrsinus on the seaboard and the rock of Olen and Alesium enclose between them—these again had four leaders, and ten swift ships followed each one, and many Epeians embarked thereon. Of these some were led by Amphimachus and Thalpius, of the blood of Actor, sons, the one of Cteatus and the other of Eurytus; and of some was the son of Amarynceus captain, even mighty Diores; and of the fourth company godlike Polyxeinus was captain, son of king Agasthenes, Augeias' son.

Amphimachus's death at the hands of Hector was recounted by Homer in the following passage in the Iliad:

. . . but Hector smote Amphimachus, son of Cteatus, the son of Actor, in the breast with his spear as he was coming into the battle; and he fell with a thud, and upon him his armour clanged. Then Hector rushed forth to tear from the head of great-hearted Amphimachus the helm that was fitted to his temples, but Aias lunged with his bright spear at Hector as he rushed, yet in no wise reached he his flesh, for he was all clad in dread bronze; but he smote the boss of his shield, and thrust him back with mighty strength, so that he gave ground backward from the two corpses, and the Achaeans drew them off. Amphimachus then did Stichius and goodly Menestheus, leaders of the Athenians, carry to the host of the Achaeans, and Imbrius the twain Aiantes bare away, their hearts fierce with furious valour. And as when two lions that have snatched away a goat from sharp-toothed hounds, bear it through the thick brush, holding it in their jaws high above the ground, even so the twain warrior Aiantes held Imbrius on high, and stripped him of his armour. And the head did the son of Oïleus cut from the tender neck, being wroth for the slaying of Amphimachus, and with a swing he sent it rolling through the throng like a ball; and it fell in the dust before the feet of Hector.
