= Aracynthias =

Toponymic epithet

Aracynthias (Ancient Greek: Ἀρακυνθιάς) was a toponymic epithet of the Greek goddess Aphrodite, derived from Mount Aracynthus, the position of which is a matter of historical uncertainty, but on which she was said to have had a temple.
