= Hippolyte (mythology) =

In Greek mythology, Hippolyta or Hippolyte (/hɪˈpɒlɪtə/; Ancient Greek: Ἱππολύτη, romanized: Hippolytē, lit. 'she who loosens horses' or 'horse liberator') was the name of the following characters:

- Hippolyte, one of the Hesperides and sister of Mapsaura and Thetis.
- Hippolyte, queen of the Amazons.
- Hippolyte, also called Astydamia, queen of Iolcus and wife of Acastus. She was described as the opulent daughter of Cretheus.
- Hippolyte, nurse of Smyrna (or Myrrha), who helped the girl trick her father Theias into bedding her.
- Hippolyte, an Olenian princess as the daughter of King Dexamenus, and the sister of Eurypylus, Theronice and Theraephone. In some accounts, she was also known as Mnesimache or Deianira. Hippolyte was threatened violence by the centaur Eurytion during her wedding feast (she having married Azan); Heracles, who was also attending the feast, killed him and rescued her.
