= Theronice =

In Greek mythology, Theronice (Ancient Greek: Θηρονίκη, romanized: Thēroníkē, lit. 'victory over wild beasts' or 'beast victory') was an Olenian princess as the daughter of King Dexamenus and the twin sister of Theraephone. These maidens were wed to the Molionides, Eurytus and Cteatus. Theronice's son by the latter was Amphimachus, one of the Achaean Leaders. Her other possible siblings were Eurypylus and Deianira, also known as Mnesimache or Hippolyte.
