= Theraephone =

In Greek mythology, Theraephone (Ancient Greek: Θηραιφόνη, romanized: Thēraiphónē, lit. 'slayer of beasts') was an Olenian princess as the daughter of King Dexamenus of Olenus and the twin sister of Theronice. These maidens were wed to the Molionides, Cteatus and Eurytus. Theraephone's son by the latter was Thalpius, one of the Achaean Leaders. Her other possible siblings were Eurypylus and Deianira, also known as Mnesimache or Hippolyte.
