= Stichius (mythology) =

In Greek mythology, Stichius (Ancient Greek: Στιχίος or Στιχίον) was an Athenian leader who participated in the Trojan War.

== Mythology ==
Together with Menestheus, another Athenian leader, Stichius carried the body of the Epeian commander Amphimachus off the battlefield during the siege of Troy. He later supported Menestheus against the attacks of Hector. Stichius was finally killed by the latter Trojan hero.

"Hector laid low Stichius and Arcesilaus, the one a leader of the brazen-coated Boeotians, and the other a trusty comrade of great-souled Menestheus".
