= Aracynthus =

Aracynthus (Ancient Greek: Ἀράκυνθος) was a range of mountains in Aetolia, the exact position of which is uncertain. It was said to run in a south-easterly direction from the Achelous River to the Evenos, and separating the lower plain of Aetolia near the sea from the upper plain above the lakes Hyria and Trichonida.

Pliny the Elder and Gaius Julius Solinus erroneously call Aracynthus a mountain of Acarnania. If we can trust the authority of later writers and of the Roman poets, there was a mountain of the name of Aracynthus both in Boeotia and in Attica, or perhaps on the frontiers of the two countries. Thus Stephanus of Byzantium and Maurus Servius Honoratus speak of a Boeotian Aracynthus; and Sextus Empiricus, Lutatius, and Vibius Sequester mention an Attic Aracynthus. As noted by McClure (2011), the Roman poet Statius, writing during the reign of Domitian, mentions both a Boeotian and Aetolian Aracynthus in his epic Thebaid.

The mountain is connected with the Boeotian hero Amphion both by Propertius and by Virgil, and the line of Virgil from Eclogue 2 “Amphion Dircaeus in Actaeo Aracyntho”—would seem to place the mountain on the frontiers of Boeotia and Attica.

There was also said to be a temple to Aphrodite Aracynthias on Aracynthus.
