= Dexamenus =

Characters in Greek mythology

Dexamenus (/dɛkˈsæmɪnəs/; Ancient Greek: Δεξάμενος, romanized: Dexámenos, lit. 'hospitable' or 'receiver') was a name attributed to at least three characters in Greek mythology.

- Dexamenus, son of Oeceus, and a king of Olenus. The Centaur Eurytion forced him to betroth his daughter, Mnesimache, to him. Heracles rescued the girl, killing Eurytion when he showed up to claim his bride. In another version of the tale, the girl was instead Deianira, Heracles' future wife (elsewhere said to be a daughter of Oeneus or Dionysus and Althaea). Heracles violated her and promised her father that he would marry her. After his departure, Eurytion appeared, demanding Deianira as his bride. Her father, afraid, gave in, but Heracles reappeared just in time and slew the Centaur. In yet another variant, the daughter's name is Hippolyte and Eurytion threatens violence to her at her wedding feast (she having married Azan); Heracles, who is also attending the feast, kills him. Dexamenus' other children include Eurypylus and the twins Theronice and Theraephone, both also married another set of twins, the Molionides.
- Dexamenus, son of Heracles and father of Ambrax, king of Ambracia (a city in Epirus).
- Dexamenus, son of Mesolus and Ambracia, the daughter of Phorbas. After him a part of the region Ambracia was called Dexamenae.
