= Eurytus and Cteatus =

In Greek mythology, Eurytus (/ˈjʊərɪtəs/; Ancient Greek: Εὔρυτος) and Cteatus (/ˈtiːətəs/; Ancient Greek: Κτέατος) were twin brothers.

== Family ==
Their mother was Molione, that's why they were called Moliones (Μολίονες) or Molionidae (Μολιονίδαι).

They were the sons of either Actor (whence they were also called Actoridae) or Poseidon and nephew of Augeas. Eurytus and Cteatus married the twin daughters of Dexamenus, Theraephone and Theronice, respectively. Their respective sons, Thalpius and Amphimachus, were counted among the Achaean leaders in the Trojan War.

Greek rhetorician and grammar Athenaeus of Naucratis, in his work Deipnosophistae, Book II, cited that poet Ibycus, in his Melodies, described twins Eurytus and Cteatus as "λευκίππους κόρους" ("white-horsed youths") and said they were born from a silver egg, - a story that recalls the myth of Greek divine twins Castor and Pollux and their mother Leda.

== Mythology ==
Greek legend maintains that the brothers were born conjoined with only one body but two heads, four arms and four legs, though Homer makes no mention of this.

Both brothers went on expeditions of war to the Neleus and the Pylians, and later led an army marching against their uncle Augeas at the behest of Heracles. However, after the latter made peace, the brothers attacked Heracles and were subsequently killed by him outside Cleonae.

== See also ==
- Naming citation for Jovian asteroid 7641 Cteatus
