= Olenus (Aetolia) =

Ancient Greek town mentioned by Homer

Olenus or Olenos (Ancient Greek: Ὤλενος) was a town in the south of ancient Aetolia, between the Achelous River and the Evenus River. It was named after an Olenus, a son of Zeus or Hephaestus, and is mentioned in the Homeric Catalogue of Ships in the Iliad. It was situated near Pleuron, at the foot of Mount Aracynthus; but its exact site is uncertain. It is said to have been destroyed by the Aeolians; and there were only a few traces of it in the time of Strabo. The Roman poets use Olenius as equivalent to Aetolian: thus Tydeus of Calydon in Aetolia is called Olenius Tydeus.
