= List of Jupiter trojans (Trojan camp) (1–100000) =

This is a partial list of Jupiter's L_{5} trojans (60° behind Jupiter) with numbers 1–100000. If available, an object's mean diameter is taken from the NEOWISE data release, which the Small-Body Database has also adopted. Mean diameters are rounded to two significant figures if smaller than 100 kilometers. Estimates are in italics and calculated from a magnitude-to-diameter conversion, using an assumed albedo of 0.057.

== 1–100000 ==
This list contains 376 objects sorted in numerical order.

Designation	Discovery			Orbital description					Diam.	Remarks	Refs
Designation	Date	Observer	Site	a (AU)	e	i (°)	q (AU)	Q (AU)	Diam.	Remarks	Refs
617 Patroclus	17 October 1906	A. Kopff	Heidelberg	5.211	0.140	22.1	4.483	5.939	140 km	–	catalog · MPC · JPL
884 Priamus	22 September 1917	M. F. Wolf	Heidelberg	5.191	0.125	8.9	4.544	5.839	101 km	–	catalog · MPC · JPL
1172 Äneas	17 October 1930	K. Reinmuth	Heidelberg	5.225	0.106	16.7	4.671	5.780	118 km	–	catalog · MPC · JPL
1173 Anchises	17 October 1930	K. Reinmuth	Heidelberg	5.283	0.139	6.9	4.547	6.019	100 km	–	catalog · MPC · JPL
1208 Troilus	31 December 1931	K. Reinmuth	Heidelberg	5.253	0.093	33.5	4.767	5.739	100 km	–	catalog · MPC · JPL
1867 Deiphobus	3 March 1971	C. U. Cesco	El Leoncito	5.133	0.046	26.9	4.896	5.370	118 km	–	catalog · MPC · JPL
1870 Glaukos	24 March 1971	C. J. van Houten; I. van Houten-Groeneveld; T. Gehrels	Palomar	5.243	0.034	6.6	5.066	5.420	48 km	–	catalog · MPC · JPL
1871 Astyanax	24 March 1971	C. J. van Houten; I. van Houten-Groeneveld; T. Gehrels	Palomar	5.232	0.035	8.6	5.049	5.415	28 km	–	catalog · MPC · JPL
1872 Helenos	24 March 1971	C. J. van Houten; I. van Houten-Groeneveld; T. Gehrels	Palomar	5.322	0.049	14.6	5.058	5.585	34 km	–	catalog · MPC · JPL
1873 Agenor	25 March 1971	C. J. van Houten; I. van Houten-Groeneveld; T. Gehrels	Palomar	5.228	0.092	21.9	4.749	5.707	51 km	–	catalog · MPC · JPL
2207 Antenor	19 August 1977	N. S. Chernykh	Nauchnyj	5.165	0.013	6.8	5.099	5.232	98 km	–	catalog · MPC · JPL
2223 Sarpedon	4 October 1977	Purple Mountain Observatory	Nanking	5.253	0.019	15.9	5.153	5.352	77 km	–	catalog · MPC · JPL
2241 Alcathous	22 November 1979	C. T. Kowal	Palomar	5.178	0.066	16.6	4.835	5.522	114 km	–	catalog · MPC · JPL
2357 Phereclos	1 January 1981	E. Bowell	Anderson Mesa	5.221	0.047	2.7	4.974	5.469	95 km	–	catalog · MPC · JPL
2363 Cebriones	4 October 1977	Purple Mountain Observatory	Nanking	5.224	0.039	32.1	5.019	5.429	96 km	–	catalog · MPC · JPL
2594 Acamas	4 October 1978	C. T. Kowal	Palomar	5.058	0.086	5.5	4.623	5.493	26 km	–	catalog · MPC · JPL
2674 Pandarus	27 January 1982	Oak Ridge Observatory	Harvard	5.194	0.070	1.9	4.830	5.558	74 km	–	catalog · MPC · JPL
2893 Peiroos	30 August 1975	Felix Aguilar Observatory	El Leoncito	5.143	0.077	14.7	4.745	5.541	87 km	–	catalog · MPC · JPL
2895 Memnon	10 January 1981	N. G. Thomas	Anderson Mesa	5.244	0.049	27.2	4.988	5.499	57 km	–	catalog · MPC · JPL
3240 Laocoon	7 November 1978	E. F. Helin; S. J. Bus	Palomar	5.225	0.128	2.3	4.554	5.896	52 km	–	catalog · MPC · JPL
3317 Paris	26 May 1984	C. S. Shoemaker; E. M. Shoemaker	Palomar	5.223	0.128	27.9	4.552	5.894	119 km	–	catalog · MPC · JPL
3451 Mentor	19 April 1984	A. Mrkos	Klet	5.158	0.073	24.6	4.784	5.533	126 km	–	catalog · MPC · JPL
3708 Socus	21 March 1974	University of Chile	Cerro El Roble	5.212	0.159	13.4	4.381	6.042	76 km	–	catalog · MPC · JPL
4348 Poulydamas	11 September 1988	C. S. Shoemaker	Palomar	5.237	0.098	8.0	4.724	5.750	82 km	–	catalog · MPC · JPL
4707 Khryses	13 August 1988	C. S. Shoemaker	Palomar	5.196	0.122	7.1	4.562	5.829	38 km	–	catalog · MPC · JPL
4708 Polydoros	11 September 1988	C. S. Shoemaker	Palomar	5.247	0.061	7.0	4.929	5.566	55 km	–	catalog · MPC · JPL
4709 Ennomos	12 October 1988	C. S. Shoemaker	Palomar	5.266	0.023	25.4	5.145	5.386	91 km	–	catalog · MPC · JPL
4715 Medesicaste	9 October 1989	Y. Oshima	Gekko	5.111	0.050	18.7	4.854	5.368	62 km	–	catalog · MPC · JPL
4722 Agelaos	16 October 1977	C. J. van Houten; I. van Houten-Groeneveld; T. Gehrels	Palomar	5.204	0.112	8.8	4.621	5.787	50 km	–	catalog · MPC · JPL
4754 Panthoos	16 October 1977	C. J. van Houten; I. van Houten-Groeneveld; T. Gehrels	Palomar	5.270	0.010	12.3	5.218	5.321	53 km	–	catalog · MPC · JPL
4791 Iphidamas	14 August 1988	C. S. Shoemaker	Palomar	5.159	0.045	26.0	4.925	5.393	50 km	–	catalog · MPC · JPL
4792 Lykaon	10 September 1988	C. S. Shoemaker	Palomar	5.253	0.092	9.3	4.768	5.738	51 km	–	catalog · MPC · JPL
4805 Asteropaios	13 November 1990	C. S. Shoemaker	Palomar	5.201	0.092	12.0	4.725	5.678	58 km	–	catalog · MPC · JPL
4827 Dares	17 August 1988	C. S. Shoemaker	Palomar	5.131	0.043	7.7	4.908	5.353	43 km	–	catalog · MPC · JPL
4828 Misenus	11 September 1988	C. S. Shoemaker	Palomar	5.164	0.041	14.9	4.952	5.376	46 km	–	catalog · MPC · JPL
4829 Sergestus	10 September 1988	C. S. Shoemaker	Palomar	5.178	0.050	8.6	4.921	5.434	32 km	–	catalog · MPC · JPL
4832 Palinurus	12 October 1988	C. S. Shoemaker	Palomar	5.263	0.141	19.1	4.519	6.008	52 km	–	catalog · MPC · JPL
4867 Polites	27 September 1989	C. S. Shoemaker	Palomar	5.170	0.019	27.2	5.070	5.270	57 km	–	catalog · MPC · JPL
5119 Imbrius	8 September 1988	P. Jensen	Brorfelde	5.199	0.110	16.0	4.628	5.770	49 km	–	catalog · MPC · JPL
5120 Bitias	13 October 1988	C. S. Shoemaker	Palomar	5.267	0.112	25.0	4.676	5.858	48 km	–	catalog · MPC · JPL
5130 Ilioneus	30 September 1989	C. S. Shoemaker	Palomar	5.198	0.012	15.7	5.136	5.261	61 km	–	catalog · MPC · JPL
5144 Achates	2 December 1991	C. S. Shoemaker	Palomar	5.186	0.273	8.9	3.769	6.603	81 km	–	catalog · MPC · JPL
5233 Nastes	14 September 1988	S. J. Bus	Cerro Tololo	5.149	0.045	3.4	4.918	5.380	29 km	–	catalog · MPC · JPL
5257 Laogonus	14 September 1988	S. J. Bus	Cerro Tololo	5.160	0.032	2.9	4.994	5.325	23 km	–	catalog · MPC · JPL
5476 Mulius	2 October 1989	S. J. Bus	Cerro Tololo	5.112	0.075	13.7	4.729	5.495	35 km	–	catalog · MPC · JPL
5511 Cloanthus	8 October 1988	C. S. Shoemaker; E. M. Shoemaker	Palomar	5.247	0.118	11.2	4.627	5.867	40 km	–	catalog · MPC · JPL
5637 Gyas	10 September 1988	C. S. Shoemaker; E. M. Shoemaker	Palomar	5.168	0.120	22.4	4.549	5.786	28 km	–	catalog · MPC · JPL
5638 Deikoon	10 October 1988	C. S. Shoemaker; E. M. Shoemaker	Palomar	5.238	0.107	10.9	4.679	5.797	41 km	–	catalog · MPC · JPL
5648 Axius	11 November 1990	K. Endate; K. Watanabe	Kitami	5.144	0.167	22.7	4.286	6.003	59 km	–	catalog · MPC · JPL
5907 Rhigmus	2 October 1989	S. J. Bus	Cerro Tololo	5.146	0.099	1.9	4.639	5.654	31 km	–	catalog · MPC · JPL
6002 Eetion	8 September 1988	P. Jensen	Brorfelde	5.226	0.092	15.6	4.745	5.707	40 km	–	catalog · MPC · JPL
6443 Harpalion	14 September 1988	S. J. Bus	Cerro Tololo	5.240	0.127	9.5	4.576	5.903	21 km	–	catalog · MPC · JPL
6997 Laomedon	16 October 1977	C. J. van Houten; I. van Houten-Groeneveld; T. Gehrels	Palomar	5.176	0.102	19.1	4.648	5.705	38 km	–	catalog · MPC · JPL
6998 Tithonus	16 October 1977	C. J. van Houten; I. van Houten-Groeneveld; T. Gehrels	Palomar	5.178	0.071	1.7	4.808	5.548	28 km	–	catalog · MPC · JPL
7352 Hypsenor	4 February 1994	S. Ueda; H. Kaneda	Kushiro	5.127	0.038	8.2	4.934	5.320	48 km	–	catalog · MPC · JPL
7815 Dolon	21 August 1987	E. W. Elst	La Silla	5.267	0.060	20.4	4.951	5.583	43 km	–	catalog · MPC · JPL
9023 Mnesthus	10 September 1988	C. S. Shoemaker; E. M. Shoemaker	Palomar	5.217	0.065	23.9	4.875	5.558	49 km	–	catalog · MPC · JPL
9030 Othryoneus	30 October 1989	S. J. Bus	Cerro Tololo	5.312	0.016	4.2	5.228	5.397	32 km	–	catalog · MPC · JPL
9142 Rhesus	16 October 1977	C. J. van Houten; I. van Houten-Groeneveld; T. Gehrels	Palomar	5.161	0.131	12.8	4.485	5.837	42 km	–	catalog · MPC · JPL
9430 Erichthonios	17 April 1996	E. W. Elst	La Silla	5.261	0.054	1.0	4.974	5.548	28 km	–	catalog · MPC · JPL
(11089) 1994 CS_{8}	8 February 1994	O. A. Naranjo	Merida	5.181	0.020	6.9	5.075	5.287	37 km	–	catalog · MPC · JPL
(11273) 1988 RN_{11}	14 September 1988	S. J. Bus	Cerro Tololo	5.192	0.095	1.4	4.701	5.683	26 km	–	catalog · MPC · JPL
(11275) 1988 SL_{3}	16 September 1988	S. J. Bus	Cerro Tololo	5.194	0.091	25.2	4.722	5.666	26 km	–	catalog · MPC · JPL
(11487) 1988 RG_{10}	14 September 1988	S. J. Bus	Cerro Tololo	5.149	0.049	3.5	4.899	5.399	32 km	–	catalog · MPC · JPL
(11488) 1988 RM_{11}	14 September 1988	S. J. Bus	Cerro Tololo	5.182	0.035	3.4	5.000	5.365	22 km	–	catalog · MPC · JPL
11509 Thersilochos	15 November 1990	E. W. Elst	La Silla	5.175	0.144	18.5	4.431	5.919	50 km	–	catalog · MPC · JPL
11552 Boucolion	27 January 1993	E. W. Elst	Caussols	5.274	0.153	14.7	4.465	6.083	51 km	–	catalog · MPC · JPL
11554 Asios	22 January 1993	E. W. Elst	La Silla	5.279	0.065	13.7	4.935	5.623	42 km	–	catalog · MPC · JPL
(11663) 1997 GO_{24}	7 April 1997	LINEAR	Socorro	5.134	0.128	14.5	4.476	5.791	31 km	–	catalog · MPC · JPL
(11869) 1989 TS_{2}	3 October 1989	S. J. Bus	Cerro Tololo	5.233	0.043	11.3	5.006	5.460	27 km	–	catalog · MPC · JPL
11887 Echemmon	14 October 1990	F. Börngen; L. D. Schmadel	Tautenburg	5.181	0.093	24.0	4.701	5.661	31 km	–	catalog · MPC · JPL
12052 Aretaon	3 May 1997	E. W. Elst	La Silla	5.227	0.069	11.5	4.865	5.590	39 km	–	catalog · MPC · JPL
(12126) 1999 RM_{11}	7 September 1999	LINEAR	Socorro	5.215	0.209	2.0	4.123	6.307	53 km	–	catalog · MPC · JPL
12242 Koon	18 August 1988	C. S. Shoemaker; E. M. Shoemaker	Palomar	5.107	0.068	29.8	4.757	5.456	38 km	–	catalog · MPC · JPL
12444 Prothoon	15 April 1996	E. W. Elst	La Silla	5.238	0.072	30.8	4.859	5.618	64 km	–	catalog · MPC · JPL
12649 Ascanios	16 October 1977	C. J. van Houten; I. van Houten-Groeneveld; T. Gehrels	Palomar	5.155	0.149	6.6	4.388	5.922	25 km	–	catalog · MPC · JPL
12929 Periboea	2 October 1999	C. W. Juels	Fountain Hills	5.244	0.040	43.4	5.032	5.456	54 km	–	catalog · MPC · JPL
(13402) 1999 RV_{165}	9 September 1999	LINEAR	Socorro	5.260	0.122	7.5	4.619	5.901	23 km	–	catalog · MPC · JPL
(15502) 1999 NV27	14 July 1999	LINEAR	Socorro	5.122	0.015	16.8	5.046	5.198	53 km	–	catalog · MPC · JPL
(15977) 1998 MA11	19 June 1998	LINEAR	Socorro	5.176	0.047	17.4	4.931	5.422	44 km	–	catalog · MPC · JPL
16070 Charops	8 September 1999	LINEAR	Socorro	5.139	0.126	16.2	4.491	5.786	63 km	–	catalog · MPC · JPL
(16428) 1988 RD_{12}	14 September 1988	S. J. Bus	Cerro Tololo	5.215	0.071	4.0	4.847	5.583	22 km	–	catalog · MPC · JPL
16560 Daitor	2 November 1991	E. W. Elst	La Silla	5.059	0.042	15.3	4.846	5.272	44 km	–	catalog · MPC · JPL
(16667) 1993 XM_{1}	10 December 1993	Spacewatch	Kitt Peak	5.198	0.200	16.7	4.156	6.239	35 km	–	catalog · MPC · JPL
(16956) 1998 MQ_{11}	19 June 1998	LINEAR	Socorro	5.223	0.113	30.9	4.630	5.815	39 km	–	catalog · MPC · JPL
(17171) 1999 NB_{38}	14 July 1999	LINEAR	Socorro	5.137	0.083	25.3	4.708	5.565	41 km	–	catalog · MPC · JPL
(17172) 1999 NZ_{41}	14 July 1999	LINEAR	Socorro	5.221	0.058	29.2	4.917	5.525	34 km	–	catalog · MPC · JPL
17314 Aisakos	25 March 1971	C. J. van Houten; I. van Houten-Groeneveld; T. Gehrels	Palomar	5.166	0.074	10.7	4.785	5.547	36 km	–	catalog · MPC · JPL
(17365) 1978 VF_{11}	7 November 1978	E. F. Helin; S. J. Bus	Palomar	5.271	0.078	11.6	4.860	5.682	45 km	–	catalog · MPC · JPL
(17414) 1988 RN_{10}	14 September 1988	S. J. Bus	Cerro Tololo	5.136	0.035	16.6	4.958	5.313	22 km	–	catalog · MPC · JPL
(17415) 1988 RO_{10}	14 September 1988	S. J. Bus	Cerro Tololo	5.145	0.049	23.8	4.894	5.396	18 km	–	catalog · MPC · JPL
(17416) 1988 RR_{10}	14 September 1988	S. J. Bus	Cerro Tololo	5.127	0.063	17.3	4.806	5.447	18 km	–	catalog · MPC · JPL
(17417) 1988 RY_{10}	14 September 1988	S. J. Bus	Cerro Tololo	5.165	0.084	2.2	4.733	5.598	28 km	–	catalog · MPC · JPL
(17418) 1988 RT_{12}	14 September 1988	S. J. Bus	Cerro Tololo	5.180	0.161	6.5	4.345	6.015	16 km	–	catalog · MPC · JPL
(17419) 1988 RH_{13}	14 September 1988	S. J. Bus	Cerro Tololo	5.223	0.064	15.9	4.888	5.558	33 km	–	catalog · MPC · JPL
(17420) 1988 RL_{13}	14 September 1988	S. J. Bus	Cerro Tololo	5.197	0.084	15.9	4.761	5.633	18 km	–	catalog · MPC · JPL
(17421) 1988 SW_{1}	16 September 1988	S. J. Bus	Cerro Tololo	5.141	0.100	16.9	4.626	5.655	24 km	–	catalog · MPC · JPL
(17423) 1988 SK_{2}	16 September 1988	S. J. Bus	Cerro Tololo	5.214	0.094	1.6	4.722	5.705	15 km	–	catalog · MPC · JPL
(17424) 1988 SP_{2}	16 September 1988	S. J. Bus	Cerro Tololo	5.199	0.158	12.7	4.376	6.022	18 km	–	catalog · MPC · JPL
(17442) 1989 UO_{5}	30 October 1989	S. J. Bus	Cerro Tololo	5.240	0.047	15.8	4.993	5.487	23 km	–	catalog · MPC · JPL
17492 Hippasos	10 December 1991	F. Börngen	Tautenburg	5.176	0.072	29.1	4.802	5.551	54 km	–	catalog · MPC · JPL
(18037) 1999 NA_{38}	14 July 1999	LINEAR	Socorro	5.237	0.084	15.4	4.800	5.675	24 km	–	catalog · MPC · JPL
(18046) 1999 RN_{116}	9 September 1999	LINEAR	Socorro	5.202	0.059	33.3	4.897	5.507	43 km	–	catalog · MPC · JPL
(18054) 1999 SW_{7}	29 September 1999	LINEAR	Socorro	5.243	0.019	19.7	5.144	5.341	36 km	–	catalog · MPC · JPL
(18137) 2000 OU_{30}	30 July 2000	LINEAR	Socorro	5.103	0.016	7.7	5.021	5.185	34 km	–	catalog · MPC · JPL
18228 Hyperenor	26 March 1971	C. J. van Houten; I. van Houten-Groeneveld; T. Gehrels	Palomar	5.278	0.128	3.2	4.604	5.952	23 km	–	catalog · MPC · JPL
18268 Dardanos	16 October 1977	C. J. van Houten; I. van Houten-Groeneveld; T. Gehrels	Palomar	5.160	0.097	16.6	4.659	5.660	20 km	–	catalog · MPC · JPL
18278 Drymas	16 October 1977	C. J. van Houten; I. van Houten-Groeneveld; T. Gehrels	Palomar	5.178	0.069	17.9	4.822	5.533	29 km	–	catalog · MPC · JPL
18281 Tros	16 October 1977	C. J. van Houten; I. van Houten-Groeneveld; T. Gehrels	Palomar	5.206	0.104	9.5	4.667	5.745	14 km	–	catalog · MPC · JPL
18282 Ilos	16 October 1977	C. J. van Houten; I. van Houten-Groeneveld; T. Gehrels	Palomar	5.233	0.076	8.7	4.834	5.631	15 km	–	catalog · MPC · JPL
18493 Demoleon	17 April 1996	E. W. Elst	La Silla	5.288	0.093	17.2	4.795	5.782	33 km	–	catalog · MPC · JPL
(18940) 2000 QV_{49}	24 August 2000	LINEAR	Socorro	5.241	0.076	3.7	4.845	5.638	21 km	–	catalog · MPC · JPL
(18971) 2000 QY_{177}	31 August 2000	LINEAR	Socorro	5.202	0.119	14.0	4.581	5.822	25 km	–	catalog · MPC · JPL
(19018) 2000 RL_{100}	5 September 2000	LONEOS	Anderson Mesa	5.216	0.100	27.7	4.693	5.739	32 km	–	catalog · MPC · JPL
(19020) 2000 SC_{6}	20 September 2000	LINEAR	Socorro	5.209	0.114	17.1	4.616	5.802	43 km	–	catalog · MPC · JPL
(19844) 2000 ST_{317}	30 September 2000	LINEAR	Socorro	5.194	0.051	40.4	4.931	5.456	38 km	–	catalog · MPC · JPL
(22180) 2000 YZ	19 December 2000	LONEOS	Anderson Mesa	5.177	0.071	29.3	4.808	5.545	40 km	–	catalog · MPC · JPL
(22808) 1999 RU_{12}	7 September 1999	LINEAR	Socorro	5.190	0.186	10.5	4.224	6.157	21 km	–	catalog · MPC · JPL
(23463) 1989 TX_{11}	2 October 1989	S. J. Bus	Cerro Tololo	5.177	0.049	12.9	4.925	5.428	26 km	–	catalog · MPC · JPL
23549 Epicles	9 March 1994	E. W. Elst	Caussols	5.267	0.045	9.0	5.031	5.502	18 km	–	catalog · MPC · JPL
(23694) 1997 KZ_{3}	29 May 1997	Spacewatch	Kitt Peak	5.217	0.037	9.8	5.022	5.412	32 km	–	catalog · MPC · JPL
(23987) 1999 NB_{63}	13 July 1999	LINEAR	Socorro	5.188	0.169	21.4	4.312	6.065	21 km	–	catalog · MPC · JPL
(24018) 1999 RU_{134}	9 September 1999	LINEAR	Socorro	5.231	0.049	15.8	4.975	5.487	24 km	–	catalog · MPC · JPL
(24022) 1999 RA_{144}	9 September 1999	LINEAR	Socorro	5.317	0.091	9.9	4.830	5.803	21 km	–	catalog · MPC · JPL
(24444) 2000 OP_{32}	30 July 2000	LINEAR	Socorro	5.150	0.056	6.9	4.863	5.437	24 km	–	catalog · MPC · JPL
(24446) 2000 PR_{25}	4 August 2000	LINEAR	Socorro	5.227	0.081	25.3	4.801	5.652	31 km	–	catalog · MPC · JPL
(24448) 2000 QE_{42}	24 August 2000	LINEAR	Socorro	5.155	0.054	8.9	4.879	5.431	26 km	–	catalog · MPC · JPL
(24449) 2000 QL_{63}	28 August 2000	LINEAR	Socorro	5.222	0.050	36.9	4.960	5.484	23 km	–	catalog · MPC · JPL
(24451) 2000 QS_{104}	28 August 2000	LINEAR	Socorro	5.284	0.130	21.4	4.595	5.972	41 km	–	catalog · MPC · JPL
(24452) 2000 QU_{167}	31 August 2000	LINEAR	Socorro	5.190	0.060	6.9	4.880	5.500	19 km	–	catalog · MPC · JPL
(24453) 2000 QG_{173}	31 August 2000	LINEAR	Socorro	5.160	0.055	9.8	4.877	5.443	28 km	–	catalog · MPC · JPL
(24454) 2000 QF_{198}	29 August 2000	LINEAR	Socorro	5.072	0.033	4.2	4.907	5.237	28 km	–	catalog · MPC · JPL
(24456) 2000 RO_{25}	1 September 2000	LINEAR	Socorro	5.204	0.042	8.1	4.985	5.423	21 km	–	catalog · MPC · JPL
(24458) 2000 RP_{100}	5 September 2000	LONEOS	Anderson Mesa	5.224	0.092	18.2	4.741	5.707	26 km	–	catalog · MPC · JPL
(24459) 2000 RF_{103}	5 September 2000	LONEOS	Anderson Mesa	5.262	0.119	15.5	4.635	5.890	28 km	–	catalog · MPC · JPL
(24467) 2000 SS_{165}	23 September 2000	LINEAR	Socorro	5.252	0.102	16.4	4.716	5.787	21 km	–	catalog · MPC · JPL
(24470) 2000 SJ_{310}	26 September 2000	LINEAR	Socorro	5.238	0.085	23.9	4.792	5.685	33 km	–	catalog · MPC · JPL
(24471) 2000 SH_{313}	27 September 2000	LINEAR	Socorro	5.318	0.046	27.0	5.076	5.560	29 km	–	catalog · MPC · JPL
(24472) 2000 SY_{317}	30 September 2000	LINEAR	Socorro	5.192	0.045	21.1	4.960	5.423	29 km	–	catalog · MPC · JPL
(25344) 1999 RN_{72}	7 September 1999	LINEAR	Socorro	5.312	0.069	19.8	4.947	5.676	23 km	–	catalog · MPC · JPL
(25347) 1999 RQ_{116}	9 September 1999	LINEAR	Socorro	5.243	0.072	17.4	4.864	5.622	29 km	–	catalog · MPC · JPL
(25883) 2000 RD_{88}	2 September 2000	NEAT	Haleakala	5.149	0.023	18.6	5.028	5.270	30 km	–	catalog · MPC · JPL
29196 Dius	19 December 1990	R. P. Binzel	McGraw-Hill	5.254	0.051	3.9	4.984	5.524	16 km	–	catalog · MPC · JPL
29314 Eurydamas	8 February 1994	E. W. Elst	La Silla	5.295	0.075	15.2	4.897	5.693	21 km	–	catalog · MPC · JPL
(29603) 1998 MO_{44}	19 June 1998	LINEAR	Socorro	5.141	0.035	33.4	4.962	5.319	33 km	–	catalog · MPC · JPL
(29976) 1999 NE_{9}	13 July 1999	LINEAR	Socorro	5.162	0.009	30.1	5.116	5.209	34 km	–	catalog · MPC · JPL
(29977) 1999 NH_{11}	13 July 1999	LINEAR	Socorro	5.223	0.089	24.0	4.757	5.690	33 km	–	catalog · MPC · JPL
(30498) 2000 QK_{100}	28 August 2000	LINEAR	Socorro	5.280	0.091	4.7	4.802	5.758	22 km	–	catalog · MPC · JPL
(30499) 2000 QE_{169}	31 August 2000	LINEAR	Socorro	5.174	0.057	3.9	4.880	5.468	21 km	–	catalog · MPC · JPL
(30504) 2000 RS_{80}	1 September 2000	LINEAR	Socorro	5.224	0.063	5.3	4.896	5.551	29 km	–	catalog · MPC · JPL
(30505) 2000 RW_{82}	1 September 2000	LINEAR	Socorro	5.208	0.081	28.7	4.786	5.631	26 km	–	catalog · MPC · JPL
(30506) 2000 RO_{85}	2 September 2000	LONEOS	Anderson Mesa	5.126	0.082	20.1	4.706	5.546	34 km	–	catalog · MPC · JPL
(30508) 2000 SZ_{130}	22 September 2000	LINEAR	Socorro	5.117	0.047	17.2	4.874	5.359	16 km	–	catalog · MPC · JPL
30698 Hippokoon	16 October 1977	C. J. van Houten; I. van Houten-Groeneveld; T. Gehrels	Palomar	5.175	0.065	7.9	4.838	5.513	18 km	–	catalog · MPC · JPL
30704 Phegeus	16 October 1977	C. J. van Houten; I. van Houten-Groeneveld; T. Gehrels	Palomar	5.252	0.040	14.9	5.040	5.465	27 km	–	catalog · MPC · JPL
30705 Idaios	16 October 1977	C. J. van Houten; I. van Houten-Groeneveld; T. Gehrels	Palomar	5.194	0.061	19.8	4.879	5.509	45 km	–	catalog · MPC · JPL
30708 Echepolos	16 October 1977	C. J. van Houten; I. van Houten-Groeneveld; T. Gehrels	Palomar	5.203	0.013	24.2	5.137	5.269	25 km	–	catalog · MPC · JPL
(30791) 1988 RY_{11}	14 September 1988	S. J. Bus	Cerro Tololo	5.219	0.062	24.7	4.897	5.540	20 km	–	catalog · MPC · JPL
(30792) 1988 RP_{12}	14 September 1988	S. J. Bus	Cerro Tololo	5.225	0.035	4.4	5.040	5.411	18 km	–	catalog · MPC · JPL
(30793) 1988 SJ_{3}	16 September 1988	S. J. Bus	Cerro Tololo	5.234	0.061	21.0	4.916	5.551	19 km	–	catalog · MPC · JPL
(30806) 1989 UP_{5}	30 October 1989	S. J. Bus	Cerro Tololo	5.241	0.034	2.1	5.063	5.418	13 km	–	catalog · MPC · JPL
(30807) 1989 UQ_{5}	30 October 1989	S. J. Bus	Cerro Tololo	5.196	0.060	4.7	4.886	5.505	21 km	–	catalog · MPC · JPL
30942 Helicaon	8 February 1994	E. W. Elst	La Silla	5.200	0.065	22.9	4.862	5.538	33 km	–	catalog · MPC · JPL
31037 Mydon	20 April 1996	E. W. Elst	La Silla	5.251	0.130	7.3	4.567	5.935	19 km	–	catalog · MPC · JPL
(31342) 1998 MU_{31}	24 June 1998	LINEAR	Socorro	5.225	0.077	24.4	4.821	5.630	47 km	–	catalog · MPC · JPL
31344 Agathon	30 July 1998	J. Broughton	Reedy Creek	5.345	0.039	7.5	5.139	5.551	41 km	–	catalog · MPC · JPL
(31806) 1999 NE_{11}	13 July 1999	LINEAR	Socorro	5.195	0.096	34.1	4.695	5.695	24 km	–	catalog · MPC · JPL
(31814) 1999 RW_{70}	7 September 1999	LINEAR	Socorro	5.325	0.071	4.4	4.948	5.702	18 km	–	catalog · MPC · JPL
(31819) 1999 RS_{150}	9 September 1999	LINEAR	Socorro	5.248	0.010	14.3	5.198	5.299	30 km	–	catalog · MPC · JPL
(31820) 1999 RT_{186}	9 September 1999	LINEAR	Socorro	5.301	0.080	2.4	4.876	5.726	17 km	–	catalog · MPC · JPL
(31821) 1999 RK_{225}	3 September 1999	Spacewatch	Kitt Peak	5.238	0.062	10.8	4.915	5.560	20 km	–	catalog · MPC · JPL
(32339) 2000 QA_{88}	25 August 2000	LINEAR	Socorro	5.216	0.110	18.9	4.643	5.790	28 km	–	catalog · MPC · JPL
(32356) 2000 QM_{124}	28 August 2000	LINEAR	Socorro	5.209	0.157	12.7	4.393	6.025	15 km	–	catalog · MPC · JPL
(32370) 2000 QY_{151}	26 August 2000	LINEAR	Socorro	5.163	0.058	7.4	4.862	5.465	18 km	–	catalog · MPC · JPL
(32396) 2000 QY_{213}	31 August 2000	LINEAR	Socorro	5.220	0.130	3.9	4.543	5.896	20 km	–	catalog · MPC · JPL
(32397) 2000 QL_{214}	31 August 2000	LINEAR	Socorro	5.239	0.009	5.6	5.191	5.288	31 km	–	catalog · MPC · JPL
(32420) 2000 RS_{40}	3 September 2000	LINEAR	Socorro	5.322	0.069	13.9	4.954	5.690	20 km	–	catalog · MPC · JPL
(32430) 2000 RQ_{83}	1 September 2000	LINEAR	Socorro	5.316	0.056	6.8	5.017	5.615	13 km	–	catalog · MPC · JPL
(32434) 2000 RW_{96}	5 September 2000	LONEOS	Anderson Mesa	5.200	0.148	23.5	4.428	5.971	21 km	–	catalog · MPC · JPL
(32435) 2000 RZ_{96}	5 September 2000	LONEOS	Anderson Mesa	5.216	0.126	21.7	4.557	5.875	31 km	–	catalog · MPC · JPL
(32437) 2000 RR_{97}	5 September 2000	LONEOS	Anderson Mesa	5.197	0.124	23.1	4.552	5.842	29 km	–	catalog · MPC · JPL
(32440) 2000 RC_{100}	5 September 2000	LONEOS	Anderson Mesa	5.160	0.028	31.4	5.013	5.307	29 km	–	catalog · MPC · JPL
(32451) 2000 SP_{25}	23 September 2000	LINEAR	Socorro	5.217	0.100	19.7	4.696	5.738	27 km	–	catalog · MPC · JPL
(32461) 2000 SP_{93}	23 September 2000	LINEAR	Socorro	5.149	0.069	30.9	4.793	5.505	23 km	–	catalog · MPC · JPL
(32464) 2000 SB_{132}	22 September 2000	LINEAR	Socorro	5.243	0.016	25.2	5.159	5.327	30 km	–	catalog · MPC · JPL
(32467) 2000 SL_{174}	28 September 2000	LINEAR	Socorro	5.231	0.026	29.7	5.097	5.366	20 km	–	catalog · MPC · JPL
(32471) 2000 SK_{205}	24 September 2000	LINEAR	Socorro	5.324	0.052	2.7	5.049	5.599	15 km	–	catalog · MPC · JPL
(32475) 2000 SD_{234}	21 September 2000	LINEAR	Socorro	5.209	0.096	30.7	4.707	5.710	38 km	–	catalog · MPC · JPL
(32478) 2000 SV_{289}	27 September 2000	LINEAR	Socorro	5.215	0.168	9.7	4.341	6.089	21 km	–	catalog · MPC · JPL
(32480) 2000 SG_{348}	20 September 2000	LINEAR	Socorro	5.244	0.093	21.6	4.756	5.732	30 km	–	catalog · MPC · JPL
(32482) 2000 ST_{354}	29 September 2000	LONEOS	Anderson Mesa	5.141	0.028	12.1	4.998	5.284	28 km	–	catalog · MPC · JPL
(32496) 2000 WX182	18 November 2000	LINEAR	Socorro	5.278	0.080	30.5	4.859	5.698	48 km	–	catalog · MPC · JPL
(32499) 2000 YS_{11}	19 December 2000	NEAT	Haleakala	5.170	0.162	16.8	4.330	6.010	39 km	–	catalog · MPC · JPL
(32501) 2000 YV_{135}	22 December 2000	LINEAR	Socorro	5.218	0.070	32.1	4.855	5.582	36 km	–	catalog · MPC · JPL
(32513) 2001 OL_{31}	19 July 2001	NEAT	Palomar	5.187	0.062	25.4	4.864	5.510	28 km	–	catalog · MPC · JPL
(32615) 2001 QU_{277}	19 August 2001	LINEAR	Socorro	5.158	0.034	17.5	4.984	5.331	36 km	–	catalog · MPC · JPL
32720 Simoeisios	16 October 1977	C. J. van Houten; I. van Houten-Groeneveld; T. Gehrels	Palomar	5.195	0.016	7.5	5.113	5.278	21 km	–	catalog · MPC · JPL
32726 Chromios	16 October 1977	C. J. van Houten; I. van Houten-Groeneveld; T. Gehrels	Palomar	5.244	0.010	5.1	5.192	5.295	21 km	–	catalog · MPC · JPL
(32794) 1989 UE_{5}	30 October 1989	S. J. Bus	Cerro Tololo	5.221	0.059	15.1	4.913	5.529	14 km	–	catalog · MPC · JPL
32811 Apisaon	14 October 1990	F. Börngen; L. D. Schmadel	Tautenburg	5.279	0.078	19.8	4.866	5.692	28 km	–	catalog · MPC · JPL
(34298) 2000 QH_{159}	31 August 2000	LINEAR	Socorro	5.171	0.125	9.7	4.523	5.819	17 km	–	catalog · MPC · JPL
(34521) 2000 SA_{191}	24 September 2000	LINEAR	Socorro	5.100	0.075	17.5	4.720	5.481	29 km	–	catalog · MPC · JPL
(34553) 2000 SV_{246}	24 September 2000	LINEAR	Socorro	5.280	0.052	14.9	5.004	5.556	23 km	–	catalog · MPC · JPL
(34642) 2000 WN_{2}	18 November 2000	LINEAR	Socorro	5.213	0.099	19.6	4.699	5.728	33 km	–	catalog · MPC · JPL
34746 Thoon	22 August 2001	LINEAR	Socorro	5.157	0.039	27.4	4.957	5.357	62 km	–	catalog · MPC · JPL
(34785) 2001 RG_{87}	11 September 2001	LONEOS	Anderson Mesa	5.142	0.040	20.3	4.938	5.347	29 km	–	catalog · MPC · JPL
(34835) 2001 SZ_{249}	19 September 2001	LINEAR	Socorro	5.307	0.082	3.5	4.873	5.742	16 km	–	catalog · MPC · JPL
(36425) 2000 PM_{5}	5 August 2000	P. G. Comba	Prescott	5.182	0.077	6.2	4.781	5.582	19 km	–	catalog · MPC · JPL
(36624) 2000 QA_{157}	31 August 2000	LINEAR	Socorro	5.160	0.022	26.3	5.044	5.276	32 km	–	catalog · MPC · JPL
(36922) 2000 SN_{209}	25 September 2000	LINEAR	Socorro	5.271	0.044	10.4	5.040	5.501	18 km	–	catalog · MPC · JPL
37519 Amphios	16 October 1977	C. J. van Houten; I. van Houten-Groeneveld; T. Gehrels	Palomar	5.210	0.007	25.4	5.173	5.248	33 km	–	catalog · MPC · JPL
(37572) 1989 UC_{5}	30 October 1989	S. J. Bus	Cerro Tololo	5.228	0.145	9.4	4.469	5.986	12 km	–	catalog · MPC · JPL
(38257) 1999 RC_{13}	7 September 1999	LINEAR	Socorro	5.216	0.121	14.8	4.585	5.848	17 km	–	catalog · MPC · JPL
(39474) 1978 VC_{7}	7 November 1978	E. F. Helin; S. J. Bus	Palomar	5.266	0.090	13.1	4.794	5.737	26 km	–	catalog · MPC · JPL
(42277) 2001 SQ_{51}	16 September 2001	LINEAR	Socorro	5.146	0.047	6.1	4.902	5.390	20 km	–	catalog · MPC · JPL
(45822) 2000 QQ_{116}	28 August 2000	LINEAR	Socorro	5.245	0.190	7.3	4.246	6.243	19 km	–	catalog · MPC · JPL
(47955) 2000 QZ_{73}	24 August 2000	LINEAR	Socorro	5.101	0.068	3.2	4.752	5.451	21 km	–	catalog · MPC · JPL
(47956) 2000 QS_{103}	28 August 2000	LINEAR	Socorro	5.141	0.069	9.7	4.787	5.494	19 km	–	catalog · MPC · JPL
(47957) 2000 QN_{116}	28 August 2000	LINEAR	Socorro	5.276	0.086	7.6	4.824	5.728	27 km	–	catalog · MPC · JPL
(47959) 2000 QP_{168}	31 August 2000	LINEAR	Socorro	5.108	0.068	6.0	4.763	5.453	13 km	–	catalog · MPC · JPL
(47962) 2000 RU_{69}	2 September 2000	LINEAR	Socorro	5.274	0.091	20.1	4.795	5.753	24 km	–	catalog · MPC · JPL
(47963) 2000 SO_{56}	24 September 2000	LINEAR	Socorro	5.263	0.030	13.2	5.106	5.419	27 km	–	catalog · MPC · JPL
(47964) 2000 SG_{131}	22 September 2000	LINEAR	Socorro	5.207	0.142	14.0	4.467	5.947	17 km	–	catalog · MPC · JPL
(47967) 2000 SL_{298}	28 September 2000	LINEAR	Socorro	5.217	0.116	6.5	4.613	5.822	21 km	–	catalog · MPC · JPL
(47969) 2000 TG_{64}	5 October 2000	LINEAR	Socorro	5.287	0.056	16.9	4.990	5.584	23 km	–	catalog · MPC · JPL
(48249) 2001 SY_{345}	23 September 2001	NEAT	Haleakala	5.105	0.015	7.5	5.030	5.180	19 km	–	catalog · MPC · JPL
(48252) 2001 TL_{212}	13 October 2001	NEAT	Palomar	5.137	0.021	15.6	5.031	5.244	19 km	–	catalog · MPC · JPL
(48254) 2001 UE_{83}	20 October 2001	LINEAR	Socorro	5.179	0.107	31.8	4.625	5.732	21 km	–	catalog · MPC · JPL
48373 Gorgythion	16 October 1977	C. J. van Houten; I. van Houten-Groeneveld; T. Gehrels	Palomar	5.276	0.014	27.2	5.200	5.352	20 km	–	catalog · MPC · JPL
(48438) 1989 WJ_{2}	21 November 1989	R. H. McNaught	Siding Spring	5.149	0.030	31.4	4.994	5.303	36 km	–	catalog · MPC · JPL
(48604) 1995 CV	1 February 1995	Spacewatch	Kitt Peak	5.141	0.087	7.1	4.696	5.587	14 km	–	catalog · MPC · JPL
(48764) 1997 JJ_{10}	5 May 1997	Spacewatch	Kitt Peak	5.190	0.091	25.6	4.718	5.663	28 km	–	catalog · MPC · JPL
48767 Skamander	3 May 1997	E. W. Elst	La Silla	5.212	0.068	29.1	4.857	5.566	22 km	–	catalog · MPC · JPL
(51339) 2000 OA_{61}	28 July 2000	OCA-Anza	Anza	5.155	0.068	7.1	4.802	5.508	19 km	–	catalog · MPC · JPL
(51340) 2000 QJ_{12}	24 August 2000	LINEAR	Socorro	5.138	0.067	2.8	4.793	5.483	23 km	–	catalog · MPC · JPL
(51344) 2000 QA_{127}	24 August 2000	LINEAR	Socorro	5.178	0.047	4.4	4.934	5.423	18 km	–	catalog · MPC · JPL
(51345) 2000 QH_{137}	31 August 2000	LINEAR	Socorro	5.221	0.149	13.9	4.442	5.999	24 km	–	catalog · MPC · JPL
(51346) 2000 QX_{158}	31 August 2000	LINEAR	Socorro	5.128	0.031	9.0	4.971	5.284	21 km	–	catalog · MPC · JPL
(51347) 2000 QZ_{165}	31 August 2000	LINEAR	Socorro	5.165	0.142	7.6	4.431	5.899	23 km	–	catalog · MPC · JPL
(51348) 2000 QR_{169}	31 August 2000	LINEAR	Socorro	5.138	0.067	7.7	4.796	5.481	18 km	–	catalog · MPC · JPL
(51350) 2000 QU_{176}	31 August 2000	LINEAR	Socorro	5.191	0.055	17.3	4.907	5.474	27 km	–	catalog · MPC · JPL
(51351) 2000 QO_{218}	20 August 2000	Spacewatch	Kitt Peak	5.099	0.070	3.0	4.740	5.458	19 km	–	catalog · MPC · JPL
(51354) 2000 RX_{25}	1 September 2000	LINEAR	Socorro	5.149	0.108	9.9	4.594	5.704	29 km	–	catalog · MPC · JPL
(51357) 2000 RM_{88}	3 September 2000	LINEAR	Socorro	5.189	0.072	9.0	4.817	5.562	19 km	–	catalog · MPC · JPL
(51359) 2000 SC_{17}	23 September 2000	LINEAR	Socorro	5.174	0.118	9.5	4.565	5.784	23 km	–	catalog · MPC · JPL
(51360) 2000 SZ_{25}	23 September 2000	LINEAR	Socorro	5.166	0.056	7.1	4.880	5.453	21 km	–	catalog · MPC · JPL
(51362) 2000 SY_{247}	24 September 2000	LINEAR	Socorro	5.203	0.062	5.2	4.879	5.527	18 km	–	catalog · MPC · JPL
(51364) 2000 SU_{333}	26 September 2000	NEAT	Haleakala	5.275	0.099	14.2	4.754	5.795	28 km	–	catalog · MPC · JPL
(51365) 2000 TA_{42}	1 October 2000	LINEAR	Socorro	5.217	0.057	30.2	4.918	5.516	41 km	–	catalog · MPC · JPL
(51910) 2001 QQ_{60}	18 August 2001	LINEAR	Socorro	5.166	0.087	32.6	4.717	5.614	26 km	–	catalog · MPC · JPL
(51935) 2001 QK_{134}	22 August 2001	LINEAR	Socorro	5.202	0.091	13.0	4.726	5.678	23 km	–	catalog · MPC · JPL
(51958) 2001 QJ_{256}	25 August 2001	LINEAR	Socorro	5.109	0.110	17.6	4.545	5.672	27 km	–	catalog · MPC · JPL
(51962) 2001 QH_{267}	20 August 2001	NEAT	Palomar	5.189	0.058	18.5	4.889	5.489	27 km	–	catalog · MPC · JPL
(51969) 2001 QZ_{292}	16 August 2001	NEAT	Palomar	5.221	0.022	25.6	5.104	5.338	24 km	–	catalog · MPC · JPL
(51984) 2001 SS_{115}	17 September 2001	W. K. Y. Yeung	Desert Eagle	5.145	0.069	9.7	4.790	5.501	21 km	–	catalog · MPC · JPL
(51994) 2001 TJ_{58}	13 October 2001	LINEAR	Socorro	5.227	0.078	12.3	4.817	5.637	20 km	–	catalog · MPC · JPL
(52273) 1988 RQ_{10}	14 September 1988	S. J. Bus	Cerro Tololo	5.207	0.087	11.7	4.753	5.660	17 km	–	catalog · MPC · JPL
(52275) 1988 RS_{12}	14 September 1988	S. J. Bus	Cerro Tololo	5.226	0.064	3.6	4.893	5.559	18 km	–	catalog · MPC · JPL
(52278) 1988 SG_{3}	16 September 1988	S. J. Bus	Cerro Tololo	5.175	0.088	19.6	4.721	5.630	20 km	–	catalog · MPC · JPL
(52511) 1996 GH_{12}	15 April 1996	Spacewatch	Kitt Peak	5.245	0.066	9.4	4.896	5.593	22 km	–	catalog · MPC · JPL
(52567) 1997 HN_{2}	28 April 1997	P. G. Comba	Prescott	5.159	0.072	21.5	4.789	5.529	22 km	–	catalog · MPC · JPL
52767 Ophelestes	28 June 1998	E. W. Elst	La Silla	5.292	0.025	12.8	5.157	5.427	25 km	–	catalog · MPC · JPL
(53418) 1999 PY_{3}	13 August 1999	LONEOS	Anderson Mesa	5.149	0.095	26.4	4.661	5.637	25 km	–	catalog · MPC · JPL
(53419) 1999 PJ_{4}	13 August 1999	LONEOS	Anderson Mesa	5.176	0.090	30.6	4.711	5.640	22 km	–	catalog · MPC · JPL
(54581) 2000 QW_{170}	31 August 2000	LINEAR	Socorro	5.169	0.100	5.5	4.653	5.685	14 km	–	catalog · MPC · JPL
(54582) 2000 QU_{179}	31 August 2000	LINEAR	Socorro	5.164	0.087	2.9	4.714	5.615	17 km	–	catalog · MPC · JPL
(54596) 2000 QD_{225}	29 August 2000	LINEAR	Socorro	5.080	0.073	5.4	4.707	5.452	18 km	–	catalog · MPC · JPL
(54614) 2000 RL_{84}	2 September 2000	LONEOS	Anderson Mesa	5.194	0.137	11.8	4.480	5.907	13 km	–	catalog · MPC · JPL
(54625) 2000 SC_{49}	23 September 2000	LINEAR	Socorro	5.282	0.051	11.2	5.012	5.552	18 km	–	catalog · MPC · JPL
(54626) 2000 SJ_{49}	23 September 2000	LINEAR	Socorro	5.158	0.063	9.8	4.833	5.483	20 km	–	catalog · MPC · JPL
(54632) 2000 SD_{130}	22 September 2000	LINEAR	Socorro	5.180	0.113	18.0	4.597	5.762	20 km	–	catalog · MPC · JPL
(54634) 2000 SA_{132}	22 September 2000	LINEAR	Socorro	5.167	0.104	20.3	4.627	5.707	18 km	–	catalog · MPC · JPL
(54638) 2000 SC_{144}	24 September 2000	LINEAR	Socorro	5.300	0.005	4.1	5.273	5.327	15 km	–	catalog · MPC · JPL
(54643) 2000 SP_{283}	23 September 2000	LINEAR	Socorro	5.181	0.074	11.4	4.799	5.563	19 km	–	catalog · MPC · JPL
(54645) 2000 SR_{284}	23 September 2000	LINEAR	Socorro	5.251	0.091	16.8	4.775	5.727	20 km	–	catalog · MPC · JPL
(54646) 2000 SS_{291}	27 September 2000	LINEAR	Socorro	5.235	0.109	3.6	4.664	5.806	17 km	–	catalog · MPC · JPL
(54649) 2000 SE_{310}	26 September 2000	LINEAR	Socorro	5.250	0.111	25.2	4.665	5.835	21 km	–	catalog · MPC · JPL
(54652) 2000 SZ_{344}	20 September 2000	LINEAR	Socorro	5.181	0.044	17.7	4.953	5.408	16 km	–	catalog · MPC · JPL
(54653) 2000 SB_{350}	29 September 2000	LONEOS	Anderson Mesa	5.229	0.052	16.5	4.958	5.501	20 km	–	catalog · MPC · JPL
(54655) 2000 SQ_{362}	20 September 2000	LINEAR	Socorro	5.146	0.093	17.4	4.668	5.624	19 km	–	catalog · MPC · JPL
(54656) 2000 SX_{362}	20 September 2000	LINEAR	Socorro	5.289	0.079	32.8	4.870	5.708	38 km	–	catalog · MPC · JPL
(54672) 2000 WO_{180}	28 November 2000	NEAT	Haleakala	5.278	0.140	28.1	4.542	6.015	23 km	–	catalog · MPC · JPL
(55060) 2001 QM_{73}	19 August 2001	LINEAR	Socorro	5.106	0.048	26.6	4.863	5.349	29 km	–	catalog · MPC · JPL
(55267) 2001 RP_{132}	12 September 2001	LINEAR	Socorro	5.135	0.031	17.3	4.977	5.293	24 km	–	catalog · MPC · JPL
(55419) 2001 TF_{19}	9 October 2001	LINEAR	Socorro	5.255	0.046	28.7	5.010	5.499	31 km	–	catalog · MPC · JPL
(55441) 2001 TS_{87}	14 October 2001	LINEAR	Socorro	5.195	0.038	10.9	4.997	5.393	16 km	–	catalog · MPC · JPL
(55457) 2001 TH_{133}	12 October 2001	NEAT	Haleakala	5.139	0.181	16.2	4.209	6.070	24 km	–	catalog · MPC · JPL
(55460) 2001 TW_{148}	10 October 2001	NEAT	Palomar	5.180	0.035	7.9	4.999	5.362	15 km	–	catalog · MPC · JPL
(55474) 2001 TY_{229}	15 October 2001	NEAT	Palomar	5.196	0.092	18.0	4.716	5.677	21 km	–	catalog · MPC · JPL
(55496) 2001 UC_{73}	16 October 2001	LINEAR	Socorro	5.249	0.045	9.5	5.013	5.484	20 km	–	catalog · MPC · JPL
55676 Klythios	26 March 1971	C. J. van Houten; I. van Houten-Groeneveld; T. Gehrels	Palomar	5.236	0.039	11.8	5.031	5.441	13 km	–	catalog · MPC · JPL
55678 Lampos	26 March 1971	C. J. van Houten; I. van Houten-Groeneveld; T. Gehrels	Palomar	5.234	0.099	7.4	4.715	5.753	18 km	–	catalog · MPC · JPL
55701 Ukalegon	17 October 1977	C. J. van Houten; I. van Houten-Groeneveld; T. Gehrels	Palomar	5.158	0.141	21.0	4.433	5.883	17 km	–	catalog · MPC · JPL
55702 Thymoitos	17 October 1977	C. J. van Houten; I. van Houten-Groeneveld; T. Gehrels	Palomar	5.230	0.030	9.3	5.072	5.389	20 km	–	catalog · MPC · JPL
(56951) 2000 SK_{2}	20 September 2000	LINEAR	Socorro	5.137	0.025	13.4	5.010	5.264	18 km	–	catalog · MPC · JPL
(56962) 2000 SW_{65}	24 September 2000	LINEAR	Socorro	5.272	0.084	15.2	4.829	5.715	18 km	–	catalog · MPC · JPL
(56968) 2000 SA_{92}	23 September 2000	LINEAR	Socorro	5.203	0.036	14.4	5.015	5.391	26 km	–	catalog · MPC · JPL
(56976) 2000 SS_{161}	20 September 2000	NEAT	Haleakala	5.241	0.035	13.2	5.059	5.422	23 km	–	catalog · MPC · JPL
(57013) 2000 TD_{39}	1 October 2000	LINEAR	Socorro	5.253	0.056	17.6	4.961	5.545	24 km	–	catalog · MPC · JPL
(57626) 2001 TE_{165}	15 October 2001	NEAT	Palomar	5.202	0.070	12.0	4.839	5.565	19 km	–	catalog · MPC · JPL
(57644) 2001 TV_{201}	11 October 2001	LINEAR	Socorro	5.098	0.053	12.6	4.827	5.368	13 km	–	catalog · MPC · JPL
(57714) 2001 UY_{124}	22 October 2001	NEAT	Palomar	5.229	0.025	16.6	5.100	5.358	28 km	–	catalog · MPC · JPL
(58008) 2002 TW_{240}	6 October 2002	NEAT	Haleakala	5.176	0.042	17.4	4.957	5.395	25 km	–	catalog · MPC · JPL
58084 Hiketaon	17 October 1977	C. J. van Houten; I. van Houten-Groeneveld; T. Gehrels	Palomar	5.190	0.137	8.0	4.477	5.904	16 km	–	catalog · MPC · JPL
(58153) 1988 RH_{11}	14 September 1988	S. J. Bus	Cerro Tololo	5.172	0.109	1.9	4.610	5.735	16 km	–	catalog · MPC · JPL
58931 Palmys	28 June 1998	E. W. Elst	La Silla	5.258	0.100	16.4	4.733	5.782	28 km	–	catalog · MPC · JPL
(61610) 2000 QK_{95}	26 August 2000	LINEAR	Socorro	5.264	0.096	12.2	4.757	5.772	16 km	–	catalog · MPC · JPL
(61896) 2000 QG_{227}	31 August 2000	LINEAR	Socorro	5.156	0.063	6.2	4.832	5.480	18 km	–	catalog · MPC · JPL
(62114) 2000 RV_{99}	5 September 2000	LONEOS	Anderson Mesa	5.186	0.181	16.1	4.249	6.123	20 km	–	catalog · MPC · JPL
(62201) 2000 SW_{54}	24 September 2000	LINEAR	Socorro	5.239	0.060	4.6	4.926	5.552	19 km	–	catalog · MPC · JPL
(62426) 2000 SX_{186}	21 September 2000	NEAT	Haleakala	5.230	0.078	31.2	4.823	5.637	26 km	–	catalog · MPC · JPL
(62692) 2000 TE_{24}	2 October 2000	LINEAR	Socorro	5.230	0.058	19.1	4.925	5.535	16 km	–	catalog · MPC · JPL
(62714) 2000 TB_{43}	1 October 2000	LINEAR	Socorro	5.250	0.040	8.9	5.041	5.459	17 km	–	catalog · MPC · JPL
(63923) 2001 SV_{41}	16 September 2001	LINEAR	Socorro	5.150	0.081	9.7	4.736	5.565	16 km	–	catalog · MPC · JPL
(63955) 2001 SP_{65}	17 September 2001	LINEAR	Socorro	5.170	0.129	20.2	4.503	5.836	22 km	–	catalog · MPC · JPL
(64030) 2001 SQ_{168}	19 September 2001	LINEAR	Socorro	5.208	0.038	7.2	5.011	5.405	20 km	–	catalog · MPC · JPL
(64270) 2001 TA_{197}	15 October 2001	NEAT	Palomar	5.183	0.094	12.9	4.694	5.671	16 km	–	catalog · MPC · JPL
(64326) 2001 UX_{46}	17 October 2001	LINEAR	Socorro	5.178	0.072	12.6	4.803	5.553	15 km	–	catalog · MPC · JPL
65590 Archeptolemos	17 October 1977	C. J. van Houten; I. van Houten-Groeneveld; T. Gehrels	Palomar	5.206	0.030	8.0	5.048	5.365	20 km	–	catalog · MPC · JPL
(67548) 2000 SL_{47}	23 September 2000	LINEAR	Socorro	5.217	0.133	11.8	4.523	5.911	18 km	–	catalog · MPC · JPL
(68444) 2001 RH_{142}	11 September 2001	LINEAR	Socorro	5.208	0.026	30.1	5.071	5.345	28 km	–	catalog · MPC · JPL
(68519) 2001 VW_{15}	6 November 2001	NEAT	Palomar	5.286	0.014	22.7	5.210	5.362	28 km	–	catalog · MPC · JPL
(69437) 1996 KW_{2}	21 May 1996	Beijing Schmidt CCD Asteroid Program	Xinglong	5.278	0.073	30.3	4.895	5.662	21 km	–	catalog · MPC · JPL
(73641) 1977 UK_{3}	18 October 1977	S. J. Bus	Palomar	5.247	0.049	4.4	4.992	5.503	15 km	–	catalog · MPC · JPL
(73677) 1988 SA_{3}	16 September 1988	S. J. Bus	Cerro Tololo	5.291	0.054	17.6	5.007	5.574	25 km	–	catalog · MPC · JPL
(73795) 1995 FH_{8}	26 March 1995	Spacewatch	Kitt Peak	5.175	0.063	22.5	4.852	5.499	20 km	–	catalog · MPC · JPL
(76804) 2000 QE	20 August 2000	LONEOS	Anderson Mesa	5.131	0.064	9.6	4.801	5.462	17 km	–	catalog · MPC · JPL
(76809) 2000 QQ_{46}	24 August 2000	LINEAR	Socorro	5.172	0.081	14.2	4.753	5.592	18 km	–	catalog · MPC · JPL
(76812) 2000 QQ_{84}	25 August 2000	LINEAR	Socorro	5.191	0.108	14.8	4.630	5.751	23 km	–	catalog · MPC · JPL
(76819) 2000 RQ_{91}	3 September 2000	LINEAR	Socorro	5.291	0.105	16.3	4.733	5.849	20 km	–	catalog · MPC · JPL
(76820) 2000 RW_{105}	4 September 2000	LONEOS	Anderson Mesa	5.205	0.093	18.4	4.720	5.689	17 km	–	catalog · MPC · JPL
(76824) 2000 SA_{89}	25 September 2000	LINEAR	Socorro	5.211	0.114	8.2	4.618	5.805	15 km	–	catalog · MPC · JPL
(76826) 2000 SW_{131}	22 September 2000	LINEAR	Socorro	5.219	0.030	23.5	5.063	5.374	21 km	–	catalog · MPC · JPL
(76830) 2000 SA_{182}	19 September 2000	Uppsala-DLR Asteroid Survey	Kvistaberg	5.179	0.064	25.1	4.850	5.509	23 km	–	catalog · MPC · JPL
(76834) 2000 SA_{244}	24 September 2000	LINEAR	Socorro	5.176	0.035	12.7	4.997	5.355	16 km	–	catalog · MPC · JPL
(76835) 2000 SH_{255}	24 September 2000	LINEAR	Socorro	5.278	0.046	6.6	5.036	5.520	14 km	–	catalog · MPC · JPL
(76836) 2000 SB_{310}	26 September 2000	LINEAR	Socorro	5.246	0.100	23.7	4.722	5.770	18 km	–	catalog · MPC · JPL
(76837) 2000 SL_{316}	30 September 2000	LINEAR	Socorro	5.204	0.092	20.7	4.727	5.681	20 km	–	catalog · MPC · JPL
(76838) 2000 ST_{347}	22 September 2000	LINEAR	Socorro	5.187	0.111	18.9	4.614	5.761	17 km	–	catalog · MPC · JPL
(76840) 2000 TU_{3}	1 October 2000	LINEAR	Socorro	5.232	0.075	3.7	4.838	5.625	12 km	–	catalog · MPC · JPL
(76857) 2000 WE_{132}	18 November 2000	LINEAR	Socorro	5.264	0.094	23.0	4.767	5.761	33 km	–	catalog · MPC · JPL
(76867) 2000 YM_{5}	19 December 2000	NEAT	Haleakala	5.167	0.030	28.8	5.009	5.324	43 km	–	catalog · MPC · JPL
(77860) 2001 RQ_{133}	12 September 2001	LINEAR	Socorro	5.072	0.063	3.3	4.752	5.393	15 km	–	catalog · MPC · JPL
(77891) 2001 SM_{232}	19 September 2001	LINEAR	Socorro	5.166	0.161	14.2	4.336	5.996	16 km	–	catalog · MPC · JPL
(77894) 2001 SY_{263}	24 September 2001	LINEAR	Socorro	5.118	0.064	26.5	4.792	5.445	20 km	–	catalog · MPC · JPL
(77897) 2001 TE_{64}	13 October 2001	LINEAR	Socorro	5.246	0.056	7.0	4.954	5.539	19 km	–	catalog · MPC · JPL
(77902) 2001 TY_{141}	10 October 2001	NEAT	Palomar	5.159	0.022	8.6	5.045	5.273	17 km	–	catalog · MPC · JPL
(77906) 2001 TU_{162}	11 October 2001	NEAT	Palomar	5.275	0.067	3.5	4.920	5.630	16 km	–	catalog · MPC · JPL
(77914) 2001 UE_{188}	17 October 2001	LINEAR	Socorro	5.301	0.026	19.8	5.163	5.438	24 km	–	catalog · MPC · JPL
(77916) 2001 WL_{87}	19 November 2001	LINEAR	Socorro	5.249	0.086	6.4	4.797	5.702	14 km	–	catalog · MPC · JPL
(80119) 1999 RY_{138}	9 September 1999	LINEAR	Socorro	5.198	0.148	29.4	4.429	5.966	28 km	–	catalog · MPC · JPL
(82055) 2000 TY_{40}	1 October 2000	LINEAR	Socorro	5.163	0.056	36.5	4.875	5.451	25 km	–	catalog · MPC · JPL
(84709) 2002 VW_{120}	12 November 2002	NEAT	Palomar	5.227	0.068	14.8	4.871	5.583	20 km	–	catalog · MPC · JPL
(88775) 2001 SY_{76}	16 September 2001	LINEAR	Socorro	5.115	0.045	4.1	4.887	5.343	14 km	–	catalog · MPC · JPL
(90380) 2003 WX_{68}	19 November 2003	Spacewatch	Kitt Peak	5.154	0.099	9.9	4.646	5.662	18 km	–	catalog · MPC · JPL
(96295) 1996 JF_{7}	11 May 1996	Spacewatch	Kitt Peak	5.239	0.092	4.1	4.759	5.719	19 km	–	catalog · MPC · JPL
(96337) 1997 LG_{2}	5 June 1997	Spacewatch	Kitt Peak	5.283	0.046	6.9	5.039	5.526	11 km	–	catalog · MPC · JPL
(97893) 2000 QV_{65}	28 August 2000	LINEAR	Socorro	5.247	0.104	9.9	4.700	5.795	18 km	–	catalog · MPC · JPL
(97973) 2000 QB_{165}	31 August 2000	LINEAR	Socorro	5.175	0.058	14.1	4.876	5.474	16 km	–	catalog · MPC · JPL
(98037) 2000 RE_{20}	1 September 2000	LINEAR	Socorro	5.245	0.065	7.4	4.906	5.584	13 km	–	catalog · MPC · JPL
(98116) 2000 RA_{103}	5 September 2000	LONEOS	Anderson Mesa	5.200	0.130	14.5	4.526	5.875	20 km	–	catalog · MPC · JPL
(98139) 2000 SG_{53}	24 September 2000	LINEAR	Socorro	5.255	0.069	7.0	4.893	5.617	14 km	–	catalog · MPC · JPL
(98143) 2000 SS_{60}	24 September 2000	LINEAR	Socorro	5.313	0.027	3.2	5.169	5.456	18 km	–	catalog · MPC · JPL
(98153) 2000 SY_{68}	24 September 2000	LINEAR	Socorro	5.313	0.033	5.3	5.139	5.487	21 km	–	catalog · MPC · JPL
(98361) 2000 SG_{361}	23 September 2000	LONEOS	Anderson Mesa	5.134	0.106	10.0	4.592	5.676	19 km	–	catalog · MPC · JPL
(98362) 2000 SA_{363}	21 September 2000	LONEOS	Anderson Mesa	5.107	0.018	25.7	5.016	5.197	14 km	–	catalog · MPC · JPL
(99306) 2001 SC_{101}	20 September 2001	LINEAR	Socorro	5.136	0.022	5.5	5.021	5.251	16 km	–	catalog · MPC · JPL
(99308) 2001 SD_{233}	19 September 2001	LINEAR	Socorro	5.134	0.021	29.8	5.027	5.241	20 km	–	catalog · MPC · JPL
(99309) 2001 SH_{264}	25 September 2001	LINEAR	Socorro	5.202	0.035	9.6	5.020	5.385	18 km	–	catalog · MPC · JPL
(99311) 2001 SQ_{282}	21 September 2001	LINEAR	Socorro	5.171	0.043	14.4	4.949	5.392	19 km	–	catalog · MPC · JPL
(99323) 2001 TE_{205}	11 October 2001	LINEAR	Socorro	5.184	0.010	17.3	5.134	5.235	17 km	–	catalog · MPC · JPL
(99327) 2001 UP_{32}	16 October 2001	LINEAR	Socorro	5.111	0.026	5.1	4.978	5.244	17 km	–	catalog · MPC · JPL
(99328) 2001 UY_{123}	22 October 2001	NEAT	Palomar	5.212	0.072	16.8	4.839	5.585	16 km	–	catalog · MPC · JPL
(99334) 2001 VC_{92}	15 November 2001	LINEAR	Socorro	5.322	0.086	29.7	4.865	5.778	26 km	–	catalog · MPC · JPL
(99368) 2001 XE_{221}	15 December 2001	LINEAR	Socorro	5.299	0.020	5.8	5.194	5.405	15 km	–	catalog · MPC · JPL
(99943) 2005 AS_{2}	6 January 2005	CSS	Catalina	5.294	0.109	13.5	4.714	5.873	23 km	–	catalog · MPC · JPL

back to top
