= 5171 Augustesen =

Main-belt asteroid

Discovery
- Discovered by: P. Jensen
- Discovery site: Brorfelde Obs.
- Discovery date: 25 September 1987

Designations
- Named after: Karl Augustesen (Danish astronomer)
- Alternative designations: 1987 SQ_{3} · 1953 RP; 1953 RP_{1} · 1989 CH_{8}
- Minor planet category: main-belt · (inner) background · Vestian

Orbital characteristics
- Epoch 23 March 2018 (JD 2458200.5)
- Uncertainty parameter 0
- Observation arc: 64.15 yr (23,430 d)
- Aphelion: 2.7460 AU
- Perihelion: 2.1036 AU
- Semi-major axis: 2.4248 AU
- Eccentricity: 0.1325
- Orbital period (sidereal): 3.78 yr (1,379 d)
- Mean anomaly: 14.269°
- Mean motion: 0° 15^{m} 39.6^{s} / day
- Inclination: 7.0844°
- Longitude of ascending node: 322.10°
- Argument of perihelion: 45.866°

Physical characteristics
- Mean diameter: 6.445±0.074 km 6.81 km (calculated); 9.02±2.21 km 9.41±0.33 km 9.73±2.59 km
- Synodic rotation period: 19.2±0.1 h (poor); 480±10 h (Note: Lightcurve plot of (5171) Augustesen (2006) Pravec/Galad. Rotation period 480 hours with a brightness amplitude of 0.8 mag. Quality code of 3. Summary figures at the LCDB and the Ondrejov Asteroid Photometry Project (data sheet).)
- Geometric albedo: 0.08±0.05; 0.10±0.06; 0.108±0.008; 0.20 (assumed); 0.245±0.034
- Spectral type: X · S
- Absolute magnitude (H): 13.10 · 13.20; 13.3 · 13.52; 13.75±0.50

5171 Augustesen (provisional designation 1987 SQ_{3}) is a background asteroid and slow rotator from the inner regions of the asteroid belt, approximately 8 kilometers (5 miles) in diameter. It was discovered on 25 September 1987, by Danish astronomer Poul Jensen at the Brorfelde Observatory in Denmark. The suspected tumbler and presumed Vestian asteroid has an exceptionally slow rotation period of 480 hours and possibly an elongated shape. It was named after Danish astronomer Karl Augustesen.

== Orbit and classification ==
Augustesen is a non-family asteroid of the main belt's background population when applying the hierarchical clustering method to its proper orbital elements. Based on osculating Keplerian orbital elements, the asteroid has also been classified as a member of the Vesta family (401), one of the main belt's largest asteroid families named after 4 Vesta, the family's parent body.

It orbits the Sun in the inner main-belt at a distance of 2.1–2.7 AU once every 3 years and 9 months (1,379 days; semi-major axis of 2.42 AU). Its orbit has an eccentricity of 0.13 and an inclination of 7° with respect to the ecliptic. The asteroid was first observed as 1953 RP and 1953 RP_{1} at Heidelberg and Goethe Link Observatory, where the body's observation arc begins in September 1953, or 34 years prior to its official discovery observation at Brorfelde.

== Physical characteristics ==
Augustesen has been characterized as an X-type asteroid by Pan-STARRS' photometric survey. It is also an assumed S-type asteroid.

=== Rotation period ===
In October 2006, a rotational lightcurve of Augustesen was obtained from photometric observations by Slovak astronomer Adrián Galád at Modra Observatory. Lightcurve analysis gave a long rotation period of 480 hours with a high brightness amplitude of 0.8 magnitude, indicative for a non-spherical shape (U=3). The asteroid is a slow rotator with a period much longer than the typical 2 to 20 hours measured for most observed asteroids. Augustesen is also a suspected tumbler with a non-principal axis rotation, also known as "tumbling".

An alternative measurement by Laurent Bernasconi gave a much shorter period based on a fragmentary (poor) lightcurve (U=1).

=== Diameter and albedo ===
According to the surveys carried out by the Japanese Akari satellite and the NEOWISE mission of NASA's Wide-field Infrared Survey Explorer, Augustesen measures between 6.445 and 9.73 kilometers in diameter and its surface has an albedo between 0.08 and 0.245.

The Collaborative Asteroid Lightcurve Link assumes a standard albedo for stony asteroids of 0.20 and calculates a diameter of 6.81 kilometers based on an absolute magnitude of 13.2.

== Naming ==
This minor planet was named after Karl Augustesen (born 1945), a Danish astronomer and co-discoverer of minor planets. For several decades he had been an observer using the Schmidt telescope at the discovering Brorfelde Observatory in Denmark, after which the asteroid 3309 Brorfelde was named.

The corrected official naming citation was published by the Minor Planet Center on 22 June 2005 (M.P.C. 54279). In its preceding publication on 23 May 2005, the MPC erroneously named asteroid (6002) 1988 RO, which was discovered by Poul Jensen on 8 September 1988, as "6002 Augustesen" (M.P.C. 54173). As of 2018, the JPL SBDB still shows the (incorrect) discovery date of that other asteroid.
