= Brorfelde =

Brorfelde is a village in the Holbæk Municipality of Denmark

It may also refer to:

- Brorfelde Observatory, an astronomical observatory in Denmark
- 3309 Brorfelde, a nearly spheroidal, binary Hungaria asteroid from the inner regions of the asteroid belt
