= 5900 Jensen =

Main-belt asteroid

Discovery
- Discovered by: P. Jensen
- Discovery site: Brorfelde Obs.
- Discovery date: 3 October 1986

Designations
- Named after: Paul and Bodil Jensen (discoverer and wife)
- Alternative designations: 1986 TL · 1930 UT; 1969 PD
- Minor planet category: main-belt · (outer); Lixiaohua

Orbital characteristics
- Epoch 4 September 2017 (JD 2458000.5)
- Uncertainty parameter 0
- Observation arc: 86.46 yr (31,578 days)
- Aphelion: 3.8235 AU
- Perihelion: 2.4821 AU
- Semi-major axis: 3.1528 AU
- Eccentricity: 0.2127
- Orbital period (sidereal): 5.60 yr (2,045 days)
- Mean anomaly: 222.85°
- Mean motion: 0° 10^{m} 33.96^{s} / day
- Inclination: 9.0509°
- Longitude of ascending node: 302.09°
- Argument of perihelion: 35.061°

Physical characteristics
- Dimensions: 19.934±0.195 km
- Geometric albedo: 0.030±0.014
- Absolute magnitude (H): 12.2

5900 Jensen, provisional designation 1986 TL, is a dark Lixiaohua asteroid from the outer regions of the asteroid belt, approximately 19 kilometers in diameter. It was discovered on 3 October 1986, by Danish astronomer Poul Jensen at the Brorfelde Observatory in Denmark. The asteroid was named for the discoverer and his wife Bodil Jensen.

== Orbit and classification ==
Jensen is a member of the Lixiaohua family, an outer-belt asteroid family with more than 700 known members, consisting of C-type and X-type asteroids. The family's namesake is 3556 Lixiaohua.

It orbits the Sun in the outer main-belt at a distance of 2.5–3.8 AU once every 5 years and 7 months (2,045 days). Its orbit has an eccentricity of 0.21 and an inclination of 9° with respect to the ecliptic.

The asteroid was first identified as 1930 UT at Lowell Observatory in October 1930. The body's observation arc begins also at Lowell Observatory, with a precovery taken two days before its first identification, and 56 years prior to its official discovery observation at Brorfelde.

== Physical characteristics ==
=== Diameter and albedo ===
According to the survey carried out by the NEOWISE mission of NASA's Wide-field Infrared Survey Explorer, Jensen measures 19.934 kilometers in diameter and its surface has an albedo of 0.030.

=== Rotation period ===
As of 2017, no rotational lightcurve of Jensen has been obtained from photometric observations. The asteroid's rotation period, poles and shape remains unknown.

== Naming ==
This minor planet was named in honor of the discoverer and his wife, Paul and Bodil Jensen. The name was proposed by his colleagues Karl Augustesen and Hans Jørn Fogh Olsen. Jensen worked for 35 years in the Meridian Circle Department at the Brorfelde Observatory, and also participated in the observatories minor-planet program using its Schmidt telescope.

The official naming citation was published by the Minor Planet Center on 22 July 1994 (M.P.C. 23793).
