= 3782 Celle =

Asteroid

Discovery
- Discovered by: P. Jensen
- Discovery site: Brorfelde Obs.
- Discovery date: 3 October 1986

Designations
- Named after: Celle (German city)
- Alternative designations: 1986 TE · 1970 HD; 1972 YP · 1973 AV; 1978 NH_{2} · 1982 OB; 1985 GR_{1}
- Minor planet category: main-belt · (inner); Vesta

Orbital characteristics
- Epoch 23 March 2018 (JD 2458200.5)
- Uncertainty parameter 0
- Observation arc: 47.74 yr (17,437 d)
- Aphelion: 2.6414 AU
- Perihelion: 2.1888 AU
- Semi-major axis: 2.4151 AU
- Eccentricity: 0.0937
- Orbital period (sidereal): 3.75 yr (1,371 d)
- Mean anomaly: 247.56°
- Mean motion: 0° 15^{m} 45.36^{s} / day
- Inclination: 5.2493°
- Longitude of ascending node: 271.35°
- Argument of perihelion: 334.33°
- Known satellites: 1 (D: 2.34 km; P:36.57 h)

Physical characteristics
- Mean diameter: 5.924±0.230 km 6.35 km (calculated); 6.50±0.49 km 6.6±0.7 km
- Mean density: 2.2±0.4 g/cm^{3} (binary)
- Synodic rotation period: 3.8389±0.0007 h 3.840±0.001 h 3.840±0.0012 h 3.84 h 3.84 h
- Geometric albedo: 0.232±0.09; 0.418±0.072; 0.4 (assumed); 0.5033±0.0778
- Spectral type: SMASS = V · V V–I = 0.880±0.050
- Absolute magnitude (H): 12.50; 12.537±0.003 (R); 12.6; 13.12±0.12; 13.15±1.41

3782 Celle, provisional designation 1986 TE, is a bright Vestian asteroid and asynchronous binary system from the inner regions of the asteroid belt, approximately 6.5 kilometers (4 miles) in diameter. It was discovered on 3 October 1986, by Danish astronomer Poul Jensen at the Brorfelde Observatory in Denmark and named after the German city of Celle. The V-type asteroid has a rotation period of 3.84 hours. The discovery of its 2.3-kilometer minor-planet moon was announced in 2003.

== Orbit and classification ==
Celle is a core member of the Vesta family (401), one of the largest families in main belt. Vestian asteroids have a composition akin to cumulate eucrites (HED meteorites) and are thought to have originated deep within 4 Vesta's crust, possibly from the Rheasilvia crater, a large impact crater on its southern hemisphere near the South pole, formed as a result of a subcatastrophic collision. Vesta is the main belt's second-largest and second-most-massive body after Ceres.

Celle orbits the Sun in the inner asteroid belt at a distance of 2.2–2.6 AU once every 3 years and 9 months (1,371 days; semi-major axis of 2.42 AU). Its orbit has an eccentricity of 0.09 and an inclination of 5° with respect to the ecliptic. The body's observation arc begins with its first observations as 1970 HD at Crimea–Nauchnij in April 1970, about 16 years prior to its official discovery observation at Brorfelde.

== Physical characteristics ==
Celle is a bright V-type asteroid in the SMASS classification and according to the characterization made by the Pan-STARRS survey. This is also in line with the overall spectral type determined for Vestian asteroids.

=== Rotation period ===
Several rotational lightcurves of Celle have been obtained from photometric observations since 2001. Analysis of the best-rated lightcurves gave a rotation period of 3.84 hours with a brightness amplitude between 0.11 and 0.17 magnitude (U=2/3-/3/3).

=== Diameter and albedo ===
According to the survey carried out by the NEOWISE mission of NASA's Wide-field Infrared Survey Explorer, Celle measures between 5.924 and 6.6 kilometers in diameter and its surface has an albedo between 0.232 and 0.5033.

The Collaborative Asteroid Lightcurve Link assumes a high albedo of 0.4 and calculates a diameter of 6.35 kilometers based on an absolute magnitude of 12.6.

=== Satellite ===
Between September 2001, and February 2003, photometric observations of Celle were obtained with the 1.8-meter Vatican Advanced Technology Telescope on Mount Graham, Arizona, by American astronomers William Ryan at New Mexico Tech and NMHU in collaboration with Carlos Martinez and Lacey Stewart as part of a larger survey.

The mutual occultation events revealed that Celle is an asynchronous binary asteroid with a minor-planet moon orbiting it every 36.57 hours (1.52 days) at an average distance of 18±1 km. The discovery was announced on 3 May 2003. The satellite measures approximately 2.34±0.11 km or 43% the size of its primary. A combined bulk density of 2.2±0.4 g/cm^{3} was modeled for the likely basaltic bodies.

An occultation of a V=11.3 star by Celle was observed by teams in Santa Cruz, CA (Richard Nolthenius, Kirk Bender, Karl von Ahnen) and Benson, AZ (Vince Sempronio) on March 17, 2026 and resulted in an occultation recorded by Nolthenius of both the primary and the satellite. This is the first observed stellar occultation by the satellite. Timings and accuracies from the Santa Cruz team of this event are described here. Further analysis of this event is in process and will be linked here when available.

== Naming ==
This minor planet was named after the German city of Celle on the occasion of its 700th anniversary. Celle is twinned with the Danish town of Holbæk, where the discovering Brorfelde Observatory is located. The official naming citation was published by the Minor Planet Center on 18 February 1992 (M.P.C. 19693).
