= 3318 Blixen =

Main-belt asteroid

Discovery
- Discovered by: P. Jensen; K. Augustesen
- Discovery site: Brorfelde Obs.
- Discovery date: 23 April 1985

Designations
- Named after: Karen Blixen
- Alternative designations: 1985 HB · 1943 GP; 1950 RT · 1953 CJ; 1962 YF · 1970 KB; 1972 XL_{1} · 1976 QW_{1} 1979 DH
- Minor planet category: main-belt · Eos

Orbital characteristics
- Epoch 4 September 2017 (JD 2458000.5)
- Uncertainty parameter 0
- Observation arc: 74.16 yr (27,087 days)
- Aphelion: 3.1569 AU
- Perihelion: 2.8585 AU
- Semi-major axis: 3.0077 AU
- Eccentricity: 0.0496
- Orbital period (sidereal): 5.22 yr (1,905 days)
- Mean anomaly: 116.45°
- Mean motion: 0° 11^{m} 20.4^{s} / day
- Inclination: 11.573°
- Longitude of ascending node: 109.09°
- Argument of perihelion: 49.585°

Physical characteristics
- Dimensions: 22.658±0.214; 23.5 km
- Synodic rotation period: 6.456±0.003
- Geometric albedo: 0.1275±0.031; 0.204±0.023
- Spectral type: S
- Absolute magnitude (H): 11.0

3318 Blixen, provisionally designated 1985 HB, is a stony Eoan asteroid from the outer region of the asteroid belt, approximately 23 kilometers in diameter. It was discovered by Danish astronomers Poul Jensen and Karl Augustesen at Brorfelde Observatory on 23 April 1985.

Blixen is a member of the Eos family (606), the largest asteroid family in the outer main belt consisting of nearly 10,000 asteroids. It orbits the Sun at a distance of 2.9–3.2 AU once every 5 years and 3 months (1,905 days). Its orbit has an eccentricity of 0.05 and an inclination of 12° with respect to the ecliptic.

Photometric observations of this asteroid collected during 2006 show a rotation period of 6.456 ± 0.003 hours with a brightness variation of 0.20 ± 0.02 magnitude.

This minor planet was named after Danish novelist Karen Blixen (1885–1962), best known for the memoir Out of Africa. The approved naming citation was published by the Minor Planet Center on 18 September 1986 (M.P.C. 11161).
