= Poul Jensen (astronomer) =

Danish astronomer

Minor planets discovered: 98
see § List of discovered minor planets

Poul B. Jensen is a Danish astronomer and a discoverer of 98 minor planets while working at Brorfelde Observatory. Between 1967 and 1969 he assisted in positional observations with the observatory's 7" transit circle. He is also a co-discoverer (with Carolyn S. Shoemaker) of the Comet Jensen-Shoemaker (1987g1). As of 2004, he was still publishing in the Minor Planet Circulars.

On 22 July 1994, the main-belt asteroid 5900 Jensen was named by his colleges Karl Augustesen and Hans Jørn Fogh Olsen in his and his wife's honor (M.P.C. 23793).

== List of discovered minor planets ==
3033 Holbaek	5 March 1984	list^{[A]}^{[B]}
3318 Blixen	23 April 1985	list^{[A]}
3459 Bodil	2 April 1986	list
3596 Meriones	14 November 1985	list^{[A]}
3782 Celle	3 October 1986	list
3796 Lene	6 December 1986	list
3830 Trelleborg	11 September 1986	list
3858 Dorchester	3 October 1986	list
3864 Søren	6 December 1986	list
3934 Tove	23 February 1987	list^{[A]}^{[B]}
3948 Bohr	15 September 1985	list
3956 Caspar	3 November 1988	list
3989 Odin	8 September 1986	list
3990 Heimdal	25 September 1987	list
4059 Balder	29 September 1987	list
4088 Baggesen	3 April 1986	list
4092 Tyr	8 October 1986	list
4213 Njord	25 September 1987	list
4452 Ullacharles	7 September 1988	list
4453 Bornholm	3 November 1988	list
4484 Sif	25 February 1987	list
4572 Brage	8 September 1986	list
4669 Høder	27 October 1987	list
4862 Loke	30 September 1987	list
4894 Ask	8 September 1986	list

4895 Embla	13 October 1986	list
5024 Bechmann	14 November 1985	list
5030 Gyldenkerne	3 November 1988	list
5051 Ralph	24 September 1984	list
5106 Mortensen	19 February 1987	list
5116 Korsør	13 March 1988	list
5118 Elnapoul	7 September 1988	list
5119 Imbrius	8 September 1988	list
5165 Videnom	11 February 1985	list
5171 Augustesen	25 September 1987	list
5173 Stjerneborg	13 March 1988	list
5320 Lisbeth	14 November 1985	list^{[A]}^{[B]}
5321 Jagras	14 November 1985	list^{[A]}^{[B]}
5323 Fogh	13 October 1986	list
5427 Jensmartin	13 May 1986	list
5505 Rundetaarn	6 November 1986	list
5900 Jensen	3 October 1986	list
6000 United Nations	27 October 1987	list
6002 Eetion	8 September 1988	list
6085 Fraethi	25 September 1987	list
6119 Hjorth	6 December 1986	list
6184 Nordlund	26 October 1987	list
(6633) 1986 TR4	11 October 1986	list
6959 Mikkelkocha	3 November 1988	list
7559 Kirstinemeyer	14 November 1985	list

(7870) 1987 UP2	25 October 1987	list
7931 Kristianpedersen	13 March 1988	list
(8641) 1987 BM1	27 January 1987	list
8820 Anjandersen	14 November 1985	list
9015 Coe	14 November 1985	list
(9840) 1988 RQ_{2}	8 September 1988	list
10048 Grönbech	3 October 1986	list
10066 Pihack	1 December 1988	list
(10490) 1985 VL	14 November 1985	list
(10495) 1986 RD	8 September 1986	list
(10496) 1986 RK	11 September 1986	list
(10497) 1986 RQ	11 September 1986	list
(10507) 1988 ER_{1}	13 March 1988	list
10723 Tobiashinse	3 October 1986	list
(11029) 1988 GZ	9 April 1988	list
(11270) 1988 EA_{2}	13 March 1988	list
(11837) 1986 GD	2 April 1986	list
(11850) 1988 EY_{1}	13 March 1988	list
(12243) 1988 RD_{1}	9 September 1988	list
(12253) 1988 VG_{4}	3 November 1988	list
(12685) 1985 VE	14 November 1985	list
(12689) 1988 RO_{2}	8 September 1988	list
(13012) 1987 SO_{5}	30 September 1987	list
(13029) 1989 HA	27 April 1989	list
(14355) 1987 SL_{5}	30 September 1987	list

(14364) 1988 RM2	8 September 1988	list
(14371) 1988 XX_{2}	12 December 1988	list
(14837) 1988 RN_{2}	8 September 1988	list
(16416) 1987 SM_{3}	25 September 1987	list
(16417) 1987 SF_{5}	30 September 1987	list
(16427) 1988 EB_{2}	13 March 1988	list
(16430) 1988 VB_{1}	3 November 1988	list
(19963) 1986 TR	4 October 1986	list
(19966) 1987 SL_{3}	25 September 1987	list
(23454) 1988 XU_{2}	1 December 1988	list
(24664) 1988 RB_{1}	8 September 1988	list
(26816) 1986 TS	4 October 1986	list
(29136) 1987 SQ_{4}	25 September 1987	list
(29149) 1988 RE_{1}	9 September 1988	list
(29154) 1988 VC_{1}	3 November 1988	list
(30787) 1988 RC	7 September 1988	list
(43770) 1988 EX_{1}	13 March 1988	list
(48418) 1988 EA_{1}	13 March 1988	list
(58155) 1988 VD	3 November 1988	list
(65667) 1987 SM_{5}	30 September 1987	list
(69269) 1988 VA_{1}	3 November 1988	list
(85154) 1986 TS_{4}	11 October 1986	list
(85157) 1987 SP_{5}	30 September 1987	list
Co-discovery made with:^{A} K. Augustesen^{B} H. J. Fogh Olsen

== See also ==
- List of minor planet discoverers
