= 3309 Brorfelde =

Hungaria asteroid from the inner regions of the asteroid belt

Discovery
- Discovered by: K. Jensen; K. Augustesen
- Discovery site: Brorfelde Obs.
- Discovery date: 28 January 1982

Designations
- Named after: Brorfelde Observatory (discovering observatory)
- Alternative designations: 1982 BH
- Minor planet category: main-belt · Hungaria

Orbital characteristics
- Epoch 4 September 2017 (JD 2458000.5)
- Uncertainty parameter 0
- Observation arc: 35.25 yr (12,876 days)
- Aphelion: 1.9143 AU
- Perihelion: 1.7208 AU
- Semi-major axis: 1.8175 AU
- Eccentricity: 0.0532
- Orbital period (sidereal): 2.45 yr (895 days)
- Mean anomaly: 76.394°
- Mean motion: 0° 24^{m} 7.92^{s} / day
- Inclination: 21.136°
- Longitude of ascending node: 29.797°
- Argument of perihelion: 218.43°
- Known satellites: 1 (Note: Electronic Telegram No. 279, (3309) Brorfelde, 7 November 2005 Photometric observations obtained from 25 October to 3 November 2005, revealed that 3309 Brorfelde is a binary system with an orbital period of 18.48±0.01 hours. The primary rotates with a period of 2.5041±0.0002 hours, and its light-curve has a brightness variation of 0.13 magnitude, indicating a nearly spheroidal shape. Mutual eclipse/occultation events with an amplitude of 0.07-0.15 magnitude suggest a ratio of 0.26±0.02 for its secondary-to-primary mean-diameter. Assuming G = 0.15, the calibrated data gives an absolute magnitude of 13.4±0.2. B. D. Warner, Palmer Divide Observatory, Colorado Springs; P. Pravec and P. Kusnirak, Ondrejov Observatory; W. Cooney, J. Gross, and D. Terrell, Sonoita Research Observatory, Sonoita, AZ; and S. Nudds, Elginfield Observatory, University of Western Ontario Central Bureau for Astronomical Telegrams No. 279)

Physical characteristics
- Dimensions: 3.78±0.60 km 3.91 km (derived); 5.038±0.083 km
- Synodic rotation period: 2.503±0.001 h 2.5041±0.0002 h 2.5042±0.0001 h 2.5046±0.0003 h 6±2 h 8±1 h 9.3788±0.0022 h
- Geometric albedo: 0.253±0.060; 0.2747 (derived); 0.408±0.060; 0.46±0.24
- Spectral type: SMASS = S · S
- Absolute magnitude (H): 13.4±0.2 (R) · 13.584±0.001 (R) · 13.60 · 13.7 · 13.9 · 13.97±0.09 · 14.062±0.064

3309 Brorfelde, provisional designation 1982 BH, is a nearly spheroidal, binary Hungaria asteroid from the inner regions of the asteroid belt, approximately 4 kilometers in diameter. It was discovered on 28 January 1982, by Danish astronomers Kaare Jensen and Karl Augustesen at the Brorfelde Observatory near Holbæk, Denmark. It was named for the discovering observatory and the village where it is located.

== Orbit and classification ==
Brorfelde is a bright stony asteroid and member of the Hungaria family, which form the innermost dense concentration of asteroids in the Solar System. It orbits the Sun at a distance of 1.7–1.9 AU once every 2 years and 5 months (895 days). Its orbit has an eccentricity of 0.05 and an inclination of 21° with respect to the ecliptic. The body's observation arc begins with its official discovery observation, as no precoveries were taken, and no prior identifications were made.

== Physical characteristics ==
On the SMASS taxonomic scheme, Brorfelde is a common stony S-type asteroid.

=== Photometry ===
Between 2005 and 2010, astronomers Brian Warner and Petr Pravec obtained a large number of rotational lightcurves of Brorfelde. Best rated lightcurve analysis gave a rotation period between 2.5041 and 2.5046 hours with a brightness amplitude between 0.09 and 0.13 in magnitude, indicating that the body has a nearly spheroidal shape (U=3/3/3).

These results superseded photometric observations taken by Wiesław Z. Wiśniewski in the 1990s (U=2), and by Federico Manzini and René Roy in 2005 and 2009, respectively (U=2-/n.a.), as well as observations taken at the Palomar Transient Factory in 2010, which gave an incorrect period solution of more than 9 hours (U=1).

=== Satellite ===
During the photometric observation in 2005, it was revealed that Brorfelde is a binary asteroid. Its asteroid moon has an orbital period of 18.48±0.01 hours, and measures approximately 1 kilometer in diameter, based on a mean-diameter ratio of 0.26±0.02 for the system's secondary and primary body. In January 2014, repeated observations by Brian Warner confirmed a period of 2.503 and 18.51 hours for the primary and secondary, respectively (U=3), with several online-published lightcurve plots. (Note: Lightcure plots of (3309) Brorfelde at the Center for Solar System Studies (CS3) in 2014)

=== Diameter and albedo ===
According to the survey carried out by NASA's Wide-field Infrared Survey Explorer with its subsequent NEOWISE mission, Brorfelde measures 3.78 kilometers in diameter, and its surface has an albedo of 0.46 (most recent result only). The Collaborative Asteroid Lightcurve Link derives an albedo of 0.2747 and a diameter of 3.91 kilometers with an absolute magnitude of 14.062.

== Naming ==
This minor planet was named on the occasion of the Brorfelde Observatory's 40th anniversary. Brorfelde was the observatory's first minor planet discovery. The approved naming citation was published by the Minor Planet Center on 7 September 1987 (M.P.C. 12210).
