= Karl Augustesen =

Danish astronomer (1945–2025)

Karl A. Augustesen (19 May 1945 – 29 September 2025) was a Danish astronomer and co-discoverer of minor planets.

Working at Brorfelde Observatory, he is credited by the Minor Planet Center with the discovery of six numbered asteroids during 1984–1987.

The Vestian main-belt asteroid 5171 Augustesen, discovered by astronomer and colleague Poul Jensen at Brorfelde Observatory in 1988, was named in his honor.

Augustesen died on 29 September 2025, at the age of 80.

Asteroids discovered: 6
3033 Holbaek^{[1]}^{[2]}	5 March 1984	MPC
3318 Blixen^{[1]}	23 April 1985	MPC
3596 Meriones^{[1]}	14 November 1985	MPC
3934 Tove^{[1]}^{[2]}	23 February 1987	MPC
5320 Lisbeth^{[1]}^{[2]}	14 November 1985	MPC
5321 Jagras^{[1]}^{[2]}	14 November 1985	MPC
^{1} co-discovered with Poul Jensen^{2} co-discovered with Hans Jørn Fogh Olsen
