= Brorfelde Observatory =

Astronomical observatory in Denmark

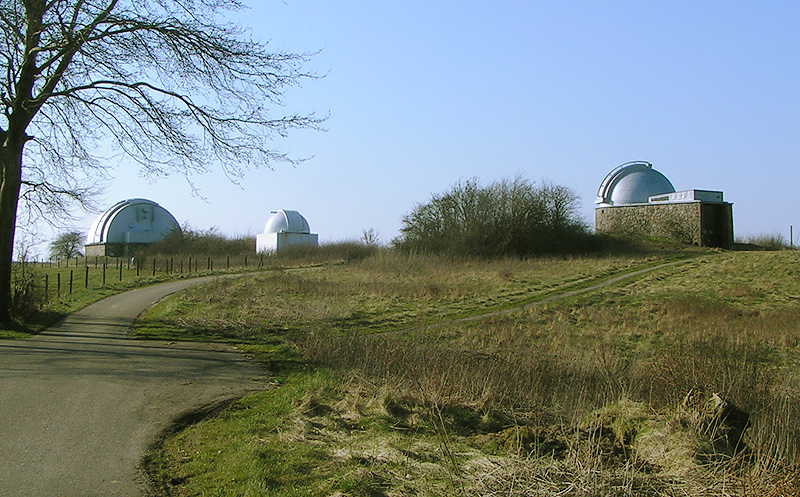
- Brorfelde Observatory with the building housing the Schmidt telescope at right
- Named after: Brorfelde
- Observatory code: 054
- Location: Holbæk Municipality, Region Zealand, Denmark
- Coordinates: 55°37′29″N 11°39′53″E
- Altitude: 60 m (200 ft)
- Established: 1953
- Website: observatoriet.dk
- Telescopes: Brorfelde Schmidt Telescope
- Location of Brorfelde Observatory
- Related media on Commons

Brorfelde Observatory (Danish: Brorfelde Observatoriet; observatory code 054) is an astronomical observatory located in Brorfelde near Holbæk, Denmark. It is home to the Brorfelde Schmidt Telescope and was run as a branch of the Copenhagen University Observatory until 1996. It still has telescopes that are used by University of Copenhagen students, but the operating staff moved to the Rockefeller Complex in Copenhagen.

Brorfelde Observatory and Brorfelde was a part of a Danish advent calendar running in 2012, and 2019 on DR1 - a Danish national TV channel.

== Instruments ==
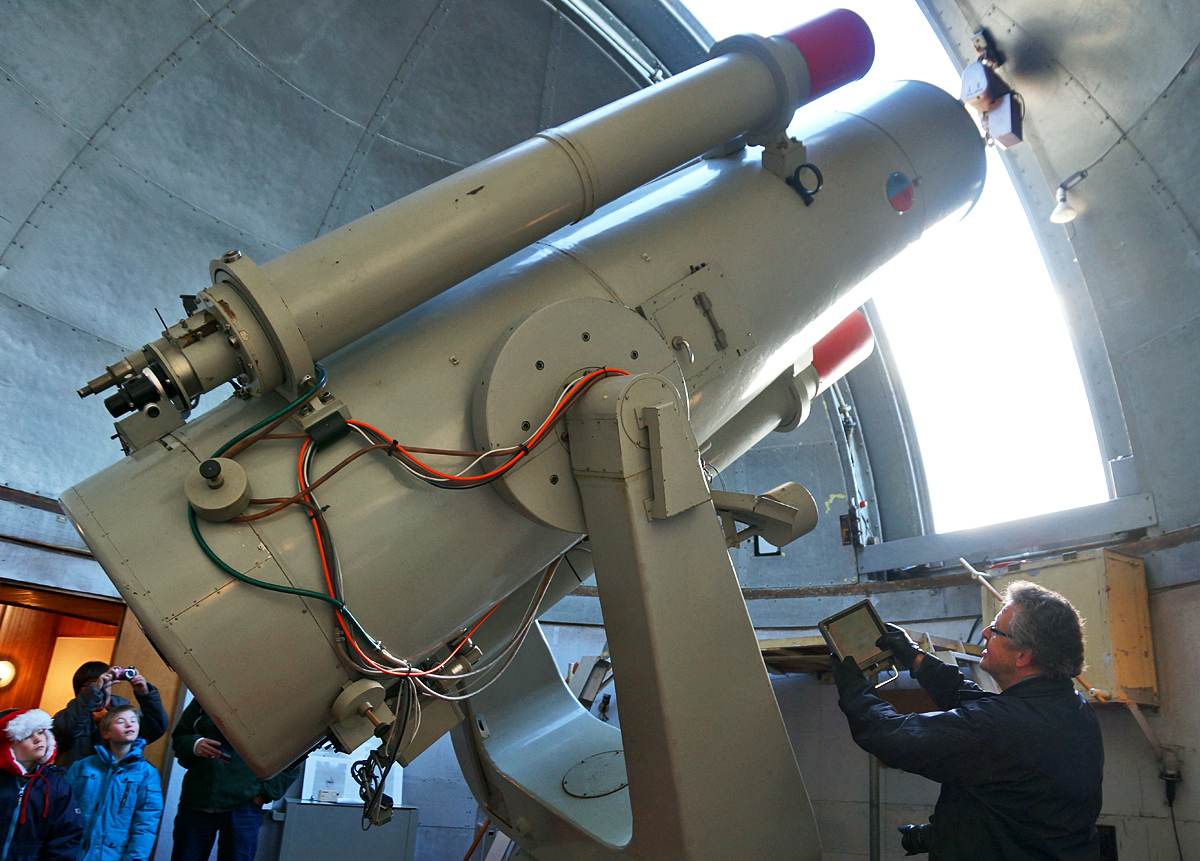
The 77 cm Schmidt telescope

The 77-centimetre Schmidt telescope from 1966 at Brorfelde Observatory was originally equipped with photographic film. An engineer is here showing the film-box, which was then placed behind the locker at the center of the telescope (at the telescope's prime focus).

== Recognition ==
The Hungaria asteroid 3309 Brorfelde was discovered and named after the observatory, marking its inaugural minor planet discovery. The naming citation was published by the Minor Planet Center on 7 September 1987 (M.P.C. 12210).

== People related to the observatory ==
- Bengt Strömgren, Danish astronomer instrumental in founding it.
- Poul Jensen, Asteroid discoverer
- Karl Augustesen, Asteroid discoverer

== Minor planets ==
Minor planets discovered: more than 100
3033 Holbaek	March 5, 1984
3309 Brorfelde	January 28, 1982
3312 Pedersen	September 24, 1984
3369 Freuchen	October 18, 1985
5165 Videnom	February 11, 1985
5427 Jensmartin	May 13, 1986
(7743) 1986 JA	May 2, 1986
8261 Ceciliejulie	September 11, 1985
9555 Frejakocha	April 2, 1986
(8338) 1985 FE3	March 27, 1985
(22282) 1985 RA	September 11, 1985
(24642) 1984 SA	September 22, 1984

== See also ==
- List of astronomical observatories
