= 3548 Eurybates =

- Eurybates and Queta as seen by the Hubble Space Telescope in 2019–2020

Discovery
- Discovered by: C. J. van Houten; I. van Houten-G. Tom Gehrels
- Discovery site: Palomar Obs.
- Discovery date: 19 September 1973

Designations
- Pronunciation: /jʊˈrɪbətiːz/
- Named after: Eurybates (Greek mythology)
- Alternative designations: 1973 SO · 1954 CB; 1957 JX · 1978 EE_{5} 1985 TZ
- Minor planet category: Jupiter trojan Greek; Eurybates binary
- Adjectives: Eurybatian

Orbital characteristics
- Epoch 25 February 2023 (JD 2460000.5)
- Uncertainty parameter 0
- Earliest precovery date: 9 February 1954
- Aphelion: 5.680 AU
- Perihelion: 4.733 AU
- Semi-major axis: 5.206 AU
- Eccentricity: 0.0909
- Orbital period (sidereal): 11.88 yr (4,339 d)
- Mean anomaly: 27.507°
- Mean motion: 0° 4^{m} 58.682^{s} / day
- Inclination: 8.054°
- Longitude of ascending node: 43.542°
- Argument of perihelion: 27.481°
- Jupiter MOID: 0.1092 AU
- T_{Jupiter}: 2.972

Physical characteristics
- Dimensions: 77.5 × 71.3 × 61.8 km
- Mean diameter: 69.3±1.4 km (area equivalent)
- Mass: (1.51±0.03)×10^{17} kg
- Mean density: 1.1±0.3 g/cm^{3}
- Synodic rotation period: 8.7027283±0.0000029 h
- Axial tilt: 150° (wrt ecliptic); 158° (wrt orbit)
- Pole ecliptic longitude: 320°
- Pole ecliptic latitude: −60°
- Geometric albedo: 0.044±0.003
- Spectral type: C B–V = 0.739±0.026; V–R = 0.384±0.021; V–I = 0.355±0.015
- Apparent magnitude: 16.2 to 18.1
- Absolute magnitude (H): 9.800±0.007

3548 Eurybates (/jʊˈrɪbətiːz/ yə-RIB-ə-teez) is a carbonaceous Jupiter trojan from the Greek camp and the parent body of the Eurybates family, approximately 68 kilometers (42 miles) in diameter. It is a target to be visited by the Lucy mission in August 2027. Discovered during the second Palomar–Leiden Trojan survey in 1973, it was later named after Eurybates from Greek mythology. This C-type asteroid is among the 60 largest known Jupiter trojans and has a rotation period of 8.7 hours. Eurybates has a one kilometer-sized satellite, named Queta, that was discovered in images taken by the Hubble Space Telescope in September 2018.

== Discovery ==
Eurybates was discovered on 19 September 1973, by Dutch astronomers Ingrid and Cornelis van Houten at Leiden, on photographic plates taken by Tom Gehrels at the Palomar Observatory in California, United States. In 1951, it was first observed as 1954 CB at the Goethe Link Observatory, extending the asteroid's observation arc by 22 years prior to its official discovery observation at Palomar. Since the discovery of 588 Achilles by Max Wolf in 1906, more than 7,000 Jupiter trojans, with nearly 4,600 bodies in the Greek camp, have already been discovered.

=== Palomar–Leiden Trojan survey ===
While the discovery date aligns with the second Palomar–Leiden Trojan survey, Eurybates has not received a "T-2" prefixed survey designation, which was assigned for the discoveries made by the fruitful collaboration between the Palomar and Leiden observatories in the 1960s and 1970s. Gehrels used Palomar's Samuel Oschin telescope (also known as the 48-inch Schmidt Telescope), and shipped the photographic plates to Ingrid and Cornelis van Houten at Leiden Observatory where astrometry was carried out. The trio are credited with the discovery of several thousand asteroids.

== Orbit and classification ==
Eurybates is a dark Jupiter trojan asteroid orbiting in the leading Greek camp at Jupiter's L_{4} Lagrangian point, 60° ahead of Jupiter's orbit in a 1:1 resonance (see Trojans in astronomy). It orbits the Sun at a distance of 4.7–5.7 AU once every 11 years and 10 months (4,321 days; semi-major axis of 5.19 AU). Its orbit has an eccentricity of 0.09 and an inclination of 8° with respect to the ecliptic.

=== Eurybates family ===
Eurybates is the parent body of the small Eurybates family (005), with 218 known members of carbonaceous and/or primitive composition. Only a few families have been identified among the Jovian asteroids; four of them in the Greek camp. This potentially collisional family was first characterized by Jakub Rozehnal and Miroslav Brož in 2011, and further described in 2014. Members of this family include the Jupiter trojans 5258 Rhoeo, 8060 Anius, 9818 Eurymachos, (163189) 2002 EU6, (287577) 2003 FE42 and 360072 Alcimedon.

== Physical characteristics ==
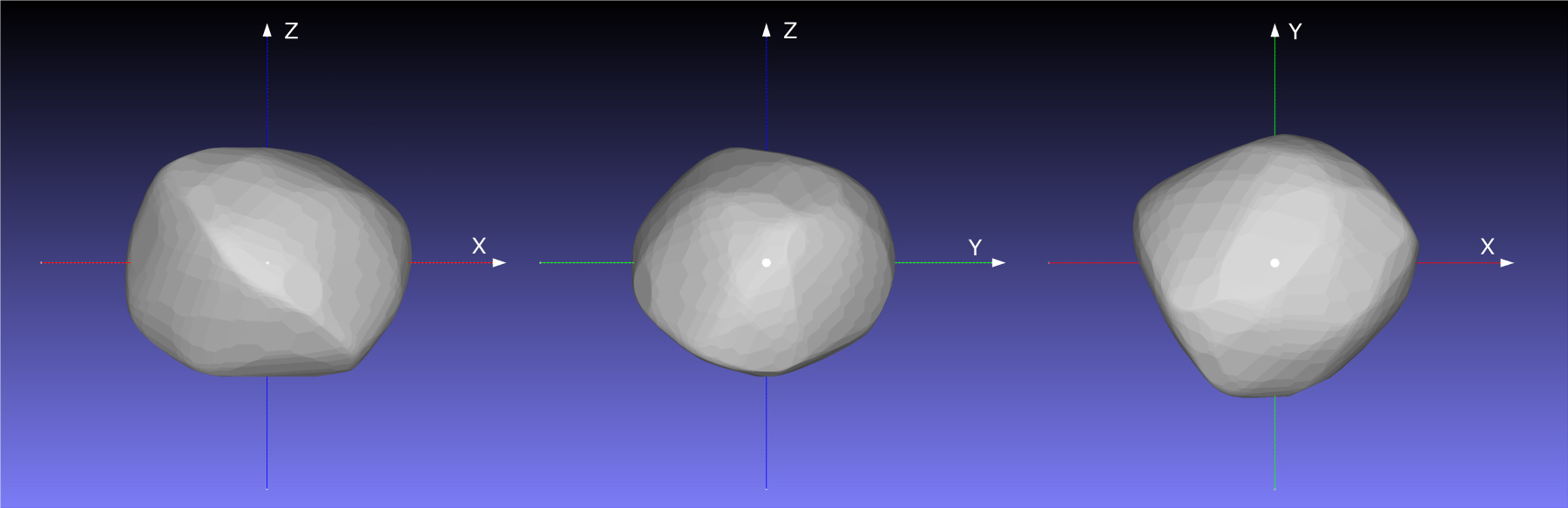
Shape model of Eurybates derived from its light curve

Eurybates has been characterized as a carbonaceous C-type asteroid by both the Lucy mission team and Brian Warner's Lightcurve Data Base. The overall spectral type for members of the Eurybates family is that of a C- and P-type.

=== Rotational lightcurves ===
In May 1992, a rotational lightcurve of Eurybates was obtained from photometric observations by Stefano Mottola and Maria Gonano–Beurer using the now decommissioned ESO 1-metre telescope at La Silla Observatory in northern Chile. Lightcurve analysis gave a rotation period of 8.711 hours with a brightness variation of 0.20 magnitude (U=3-). In October 2010, photometric observations by American astronomer Robert Stephens at the Goat Mountain Astronomical Research Station (G79) in California gave a concurring period of 8.73 hours and an amplitude of 0.19 magnitude (U=2+).

Eurybates has an axial tilt of 150° with respect to the ecliptic, making it a retrograde rotator.

=== Diameter and albedo ===
According to the surveys carried out by the Infrared Astronomical Satellite IRAS, the Japanese Akari satellite, and NASA's Wide-field Infrared Survey Explorer with its subsequent NEOWISE mission, Eurybates measures between 63.89 and 72.14 kilometers in diameter and its surface has an albedo between 0.052 and 0.060. The Collaborative Asteroid Lightcurve Link agrees with IRAS, and derives an albedo of 0.0491 and a diameter of 72.08 kilometers with an absolute magnitude of 9.6.

100+ largest Jupiter trojans

Largest Jupiter Trojans by survey^{(A)} (mean-diameter in kilometers; RP: rotation period in hours; YoD: Year of Discovery)
Designation	H	WISE	IRAS	Akari	Ln	RP	V–I	YoD	Ref
624 Hektor	7.2	225	233	230.99	L4	6.92	0.930	1907	list
617 Patroclus	8.19	140.362	140.92	140.85	L5	102.80	0.830	1906	list
911 Agamemnon	7.89	131.038	166.66	185.30	L4	6.59	0.980	1919	list
588 Achilles	8.67	130.099	135.47	133.22	L4	7.31	0.940	1906	list
3451 Mentor	8.4	126.288	116.30	117.91	L5	7.70	0.770	1984	list
3317 Paris	8.3	118.790	116.26	120.45	L5	7.09	0.950	1984	list
1867 Deiphobus	8.3	118.220	122.67	131.31	L5	58.66	0.930	1971	list
1172 Äneas	8.33	118.020	142.82	148.66	L5	8.71	0.950	1930	list
1437 Diomedes	8.3	117.786	164.31	172.60	L4	24.49	0.810	1937	list
1143 Odysseus	7.93	114.624	125.64	130.81	L4	10.11	0.860	1930	list
2241 Alcathous	8.64	113.682	114.63	118.87	L5	7.69	0.940	1979	list
659 Nestor	8.99	112.320	108.87	107.06	L4	15.98	0.790	1908	list
3793 Leonteus	8.7	112.046	86.26	87.58	L4	5.62	0.780	1985	list
3063 Makhaon	8.4	111.655	116.14	114.34	L4	8.64	0.830	1983	list
1583 Antilochus	8.6	108.842	101.62	111.69	L4	31.54	0.950	1950	list
884 Priamus	8.81	101.093	96.29	119.99	L5	6.86	0.900	1917	list
1208 Troilus	8.99	100.477	103.34	111.36	L5	56.17	0.740	1931	list
1173 Anchises	8.89	99.549	126.27	120.49	L5	11.60	0.780	1930	list
2207 Antenor	8.89	97.658	85.11	91.32	L5	7.97	0.950	1977	list
2363 Cebriones	9.11	95.976	81.84	84.61	L5	20.05	0.910	1977	list
4063 Euforbo	8.7	95.619	102.46	106.38	L4	8.85	0.950	1989	list
2357 Phereclos	8.94	94.625	94.90	98.45	L5	14.39	0.960	1981	list
4709 Ennomos	8.5	91.433	80.85	80.03	L5	12.28	0.690	1988	list
2797 Teucer	8.7	89.430	111.14	113.99	L4	10.15	0.920	1981	list
2920 Automedon	8.8	88.574	111.01	113.11	L4	10.21	0.950	1981	list
15436 Dexius	9.1	87.646	85.71	78.63	L4	8.97	0.870	1998	list
3596 Meriones	9.2	87.380	75.09	73.28	L4	12.96	0.830	1985	list
2893 Peiroos	9.23	86.884	87.46	86.76	L5	8.96	0.950	1975	list
4086 Podalirius	9.1	85.495	86.89	85.98	L4	10.43	0.870	1985	list
4060 Deipylos	9.3	84.043	79.21	86.79	L4	9.30	0.760	1987	list
1404 Ajax	9.3	83.990	81.69	96.34	L4	29.38	0.960	1936	list
4348 Poulydamas	9.5	82.032	70.08	87.51	L5	9.91	0.840	1988	list
5144 Achates	9.0	80.958	91.91	89.85	L5	5.96	0.920	1991	list
4833 Meges	8.9	80.165	87.33	89.39	L4	14.25	0.940	1989	list
2223 Sarpedon	9.41	77.480	94.63	108.21	L5	22.74	0.880	1977	list
4489 Dracius	9.0	76.595	92.93	95.02	L4	12.58	0.950	1988	list
2260 Neoptolemus	9.31	76.435	71.65	81.28	L4	8.18	0.950	1975	list
5254 Ulysses	9.2	76.147	78.34	80.00	L4	28.72	0.970	1986	list
3708 Socus	9.3	75.661	79.59	76.75	L5	6.55	0.980	1974	list
2674 Pandarus	9.1	74.267	98.10	101.72	L5	8.48	1.000	1982	list
3564 Talthybius	9.4	73.730	68.92	74.11	L4	40.59	0.900	1985	list
4834 Thoas	9.1	72.331	86.82	96.21	L4	18.19	0.950	1989	list
7641 Cteatus	9.4	71.839	68.97	75.28	L4	27.77	0.980	1986	list
3540 Protesilaos	9.3	70.225	76.84	87.66	L4	8.95	0.940	1973	list
11395 Iphinous	9.8	68.977	64.71	67.78	L4	17.38	–	1998	list
4035 Thestor	9.6	68.733	68.23	66.99	L4	13.47	0.970	1986	list
5264 Telephus	9.4	68.472	73.26	81.38	L4	9.53	0.970	1991	list
1868 Thersites	9.5	68.163	70.08	78.89	L4	10.48	0.960	1960	list
9799 Thronium	9.6	68.033	64.87	72.42	L4	21.52	0.910	1996	list
4068 Menestheus	9.5	67.625	62.37	68.46	L4	14.40	0.950	1973	list
23135 Pheidas	9.9	66.230	58.29	68.50	L4	8.69	0.860	2000	list
2456 Palamedes	9.3	65.916	91.66	99.60	L4	7.24	0.920	1966	list
3709 Polypoites	9.1	65.297	99.09	85.23	L4	10.04	1.000	1985	list
1749 Telamon	9.5	64.898	81.06	69.14	L4	16.98	0.970	1949	list
3548 Eurybates	9.6	63.885	72.14	68.40	L4	8.71	0.730	1973	list
4543 Phoinix	9.7	63.836	62.79	69.54	L4	38.87	1.200	1989	list
12444 Prothoon	9.8	63.835	64.31	62.41	L5	15.82	–	1996	list
4836 Medon	9.5	63.277	67.73	78.70	L4	9.82	0.920	1989	list
16070 Charops	9.7	63.191	64.13	68.98	L5	20.24	0.960	1999	list
15440 Eioneus	9.6	62.519	66.48	71.88	L4	21.43	0.970	1998	list
4715 Medesicaste	9.7	62.097	63.91	65.93	L5	8.81	0.850	1989	list
34746 Thoon	9.8	61.684	60.51	63.63	L5	19.63	0.950	2001	list
38050 Bias	9.8	61.603	61.04	50.44	L4	18.85	0.990	1998	list
5130 Ilioneus	9.7	60.711	59.40	52.49	L5	14.77	0.960	1989	list
5027 Androgeos	9.6	59.786	57.86	n.a.	L4	11.38	0.910	1988	list
6090 Aulis	9.4	59.568	74.53	81.92	L4	18.48	0.980	1989	list
5648 Axius	9.7	59.295	63.91	n.a.	L5	37.56	0.900	1990	list
7119 Hiera	9.7	59.150	76.40	77.29	L4	400	0.950	1989	list
4805 Asteropaios	10.0	57.647	53.16	43.44	L5	12.37	–	1990	list
16974 Iphthime	9.8	57.341	55.43	57.15	L4	78.9	0.960	1998	list
4867 Polites	9.8	57.251	58.29	64.29	L5	11.24	1.010	1989	list
2895 Memnon	10.0	56.706	55.67	n.a.	L5	7.50	0.710	1981	list
4708 Polydoros	9.9	54.964	55.67	n.a.	L5	7.52	0.960	1988	list
21601 Aias	10.0	54.909	55.67	56.08	L4	12.65	0.970	1998	list
12929 Periboea	9.9	54.077	61.04	55.34	L5	9.27	0.880	1999	list
17492 Hippasos	10.0	53.975	55.67	n.a.	L5	17.75	–	1991	list
5652 Amphimachus	10.1	53.921	53.16	52.48	L4	8.37	1.050	1992	list
2759 Idomeneus	9.9	53.676	61.01	52.55	L4	32.38	0.910	1980	list
5258 Rhoeo	10.2	53.275	50.77	n.a.	L4	19.85	1.010	1989	list
12126 Chersidamas	10.1	53.202	n.a.	n.a.	L5	n.a.	?	1999	list
15502 Hypeirochus	10.0	53.100	55.67	50.86	L5	15.13	0.875	1999	list
4754 Panthoos	10.0	53.025	53.15	56.96	L5	27.68	–	1977	list
4832 Palinurus	10.0	52.058	53.16	n.a.	L5	5.32	1.000	1988	list
5126 Achaemenides	10.5	51.922	44.22	48.57	L4	53.02	–	1989	list
3240 Laocoon	10.2	51.695	50.77	n.a.	L5	11.31	0.880	1978	list
4902 Thessandrus	9.8	51.263	61.04	71.79	L4	738	0.960	1989	list
11552 Boucolion	10.1	51.136	53.16	53.91	L5	32.44	–	1993	list
20729 Opheltius	10.4	50.961	46.30	n.a.	L4	5.72	1.000	1999	list
6545 Leitus	10.1	50.951	53.16	n.a.	L4	16.26	0.910	1986	list
4792 Lykaon	10.1	50.870	53.16	n.a.	L5	40.09	0.960	1988	list
21900 Orus	10.0	50.810	55.67	53.87	L4	13.45	0.950	1999	list
1873 Agenor	10.1	50.799	53.76	54.38	L5	20.60	–	1971	list
5028 Halaesus	10.2	50.770	50.77	n.a.	L4	24.94	0.900	1988	list
2146 Stentor	9.9	50.755	58.29	n.a.	L4	16.40	–	1976	list
4722 Agelaos	10.0	50.378	53.16	59.47	L5	18.44	0.910	1977	list
5284 Orsilocus	10.1	50.159	53.16	n.a.	L4	10.31	0.970	1989	list
11509 Thersilochos	10.1	49.960	53.16	56.23	L5	17.37	–	1990	list
5285 Krethon	10.1	49.606	58.53	52.61	L4	12.04	1.090	1989	list
4791 Iphidamas	10.1	49.528	57.85	59.96	L5	9.70	1.030	1988	list
9023 Mnesthus	10.1	49.151	50.77	60.80	L5	30.66	–	1988	list
5283 Pyrrhus	9.7	48.356	64.58	69.93	L4	7.32	0.950	1989	list
4946 Askalaphus	10.2	48.209	52.71	66.10	L4	22.73	0.940	1988	list
22149 Cinyras	10.2	48.190	50.77	50.37	L4	7.84	1.090	2000	list
32496 Deïopites	10.2	48.017	50.77	51.63	L5	23.34	0.950	2000	list
5120 Bitias	10.2	47.987	50.77	n.a.	L5	15.21	0.780	1988	list
12714 Alkimos	10.1	47.819	61.04	54.62	L4	28.48	–	1991	list
7352 Hypsenor	9.9	47.731	55.67	47.07	L5	648	0.850	1994	list
1870 Glaukos	10.6	47.649	42.23	n.a.	L5	5.99	—	1971	list
4138 Kalchas	10.1	46.462	53.16	61.04	L4	29.2	0.810	1973	list
23958 Theronice	10.2	46.001	50.77	47.91	L4	562	0.990	1998	list
4828 Misenus	10.4	45.954	46.30	43.22	L5	12.87	0.920	1988	list
4057 Demophon	10.1	45.683	53.16	n.a.	L4	29.82	1.060	1985	list
4501 Eurypylos	10.4	45.524	46.30	n.a.	L4	6.05	–	1989	list
4007 Euryalos	10.3	45.515	48.48	53.89	L4	6.39	–	1973	list
5259 Epeigeus	10.3	44.741	42.59	44.42	L4	18.42	–	1989	list
30705 Idaios	10.4	44.546	46.30	n.a.	L5	15.74	–	1977	list
16560 Daitor	10.7	43.861	51.42	43.38	L5	–	–	1991	list
15977 Pyraechmes	10.4	43.530	46.30	51.53	L5	250	0.906	1998	list
7543 Prylis	10.6	42.893	42.23	n.a.	L4	17.80	–	1973	list
4827 Dares	10.5	42.770	44.22	n.a.	L5	19.00	–	1988	list
1647 Menelaus	10.5	42.716	44.22	n.a.	L4	17.74	0.866	1957	list
^{(A)} Used sources: WISE/NEOWISE catalog (NEOWISE_DIAM_V1 PDS, Grav, 2012); IRAS data (SIMPS v.6 catalog); and Akari catalog (Usui, 2011); RP: rotation period and V–I (color index) taken from the LCDB Note: missing data was completed with figures from the JPL SBDB (query) and from the LCDB (query form) for the WISE/NEOWISE and SIMPS catalogs, respectively. These figures are given in italics. Also, listing is incomplete above #100.

== Naming ==
This minor planet was named after Eurybates, the Ancient hero from Greek mythology, who was a herald for the Greek armies during the Trojan War. The official naming citation was published by the Minor Planet Center on 28 April 1991 (M.P.C. 18138).

== Exploration ==
=== Lucy mission target ===
Animation of Lucy's trajectory around Sun Lucy · Sun · Earth · 52246 Donaldjohanson · 3548 Eurybates · 21900 Orus · 617 Patroclus

Eurybates is planned to be visited by the Lucy spacecraft which launched in 2021. The flyby is scheduled for 12 August 2027, and will approach the asteroid to a distance of 1,000 km (620 mi) at a relative velocity of 5.8 km/s (13,000 mph) and a solar phase angle of 81°.

== Satellite ==
Queta
- Discovery images of Queta taken by Hubble on 12–14 September 2018

Discovery
- Discovered by: Keith S. Noll et al.
- Discovery date: 12 September 2018

Designations
- Designation: Eurybates I
- Pronunciation: /ˈkeɪtə/
- Named after: Enriqueta Basilio, first woman torchbearer at the 1968 Summer Olympics
- Alternative names: S/2018 (3548) 1

Orbital characteristics
- Epoch 12 September 2018 09:45:13 UT (JD 2458373.9064)
- Semi-major axis: 2350±11 km
- Eccentricity: 0.125±0.009
- Orbital period (sidereal): 82.46±0.06 d
- Inclination: 155.0°±0.2° (wrt ecliptic)
- Argument of perihelion: 53°±3°
- Satellite of: 3548 Eurybates

Physical characteristics
- Mean diameter: 1.2±0.4 km
- Apparent magnitude: 26.8
- Absolute magnitude (H): 18.25+0.8 −0.6

Eurybates has one known satellite, named Queta after Mexican Olympic athlete Enriqueta "Queta" Basilio. Provisionally designated S/2018 (3548) 1, the satellite was discovered by Keith S. Noll and colleagues in images taken with the Hubble Space Telescope in September 2018. Subsequent follow-up observations later confirmed the satellite's existence, and the discovery was announced on 9 January 2020. The satellite was given the name Queta on 15 October 2020, in accordance with the International Astronomical Union's Olympic athlete naming convention for small Jupiter trojans (H > 12). In the naming citation, Enriqueta Basilio was recognized as the first woman torchbearer at the 1968 Summer Olympics, analogous to the role of heralds like Eurybates.

Queta is extremely faint, with an apparent magnitude of ~26.77. It is at least 6,000 times fainter than Eurybates, suggesting that Queta is likely very small, about 1.2 ± 0.4 km (0.75 ± 0.25 mi) in diameter if it has the same albedo as Eurybates. The satellite has an orbital period of 82.46±0.06 days, with a semi-major axis of 2,350 ± 11 km (1,460.2 ± 6.8 mi) and low eccentricity of 0.125±009. It is probably a fragment of Eurybates since it is part of a known collisional family. The presence of the satellite does not pose any adverse effects on the Lucy mission, though it provides an additional object for the spacecraft to study during its flyby in 2027.
