= Dracius =

In Greek mythology, Dracius (Ancient Greek: Δρακίος) was a commander of the Epeans of Elis, together with Meges and Amphion, during the Trojan War.

== See also ==
- naming citation for Jovian asteroid 4489 Dracius
