= Eurybates family =

The Eurybates family (005) is a collisional asteroid family of at least 218 known asteroids, named for its largest member, the 64-kilometre (40 mi)-across asteroid 3548 Eurybates. It lies within the larger dynamical group of Jupiter trojans, a group of asteroids in an orbital resonance with Jupiter such that they stay about 60 degrees ahead of/behind the planet in its orbit at all times in the Lagrange points L4 and L5, with the Eurybates family being part of the leading cloud around L4, also known as the Greek camp. All members of the family are dark C-type asteroids with albedos of around 0.05.

An asteroid family is a group of physically related asteroids usually created by a collision with an original larger asteroid, with the fragments continuing on similar orbits to the original. This is distinct from a dynamical group in that the members of a dynamical group only share similar orbits because of gravitational interactions with planets, which concentrate asteroids in a particular orbital range. Members of the Eurybates family are both part of the wider Trojan dynamical group, and fragments of 3548 Eurybates. The family is considered a catastrophic asteroid family because 3548 Eurybates, its largest member, makes up only a quarter of the family's mass.

The family's exact age is not known, though it has been constrained to under 3.7 billion years, because simulations show that 3548 Eurybates's satellite Queta would be very unlikely to survive to the modern day if it had formed earlier than this. A more recent study suggested an age of 1.05±0.36 billion years based on the modeled rate of family members escaping the trojan region over time.

== Large members ==

- 3548 Eurybates: 2.62 (26.5%)
- 5258 Rhoeo: 1.24 (12.6%)
- 8060 Anius: 0.486 (4.9%)
- 9818 Eurymachos: 0.441 (4.5%)
- 18060 Zarex: 0.412 (4.2%)
- 24380 Dorippe: 0.344 (3.5%)
- 24420 Thasos: 0.23 (2.3%)
- 13862 Elais: 0.187 (1.9%)
- 43436 Ansschut: 0.0952 (1.0%)
- 28958 Binns: 0.0926 (0.9%)
- all other members: 3.73 (37.8%)
Mass distribution of the Eurybates family (assuming similar densities)

The 10 brightest Eurybates family members
Name	Abs. Mag	Size (km)	proper a (AU)	proper e	proper i
3548 Eurybates	9.83	64	5.2973	0.044	7.422
5258 Rhoeo	10.37	53	5.2892	0.059	7.027
8060 Anius	11.05	38	5.2922	0.056	7.314
9818 Eurymachos	11.12	28	5.2860	0.046	7.439
18060 Zarex	11.17	36	5.2925	0.045	7.422
24380 Dorippe	11.30	32	5.2953	0.044	7.348
24420 Thasos	11.59	22	5.3047	0.049	7.240
13862 Elais	11.74	25	5.2928	0.044	7.336
43436 Ansschut	12.23	21	5.2970	0.052	7.165
28958 Binns	12.25	22	5.2965	0.038	7.425
