= Eurybates =

Multiple Greek mythological figures

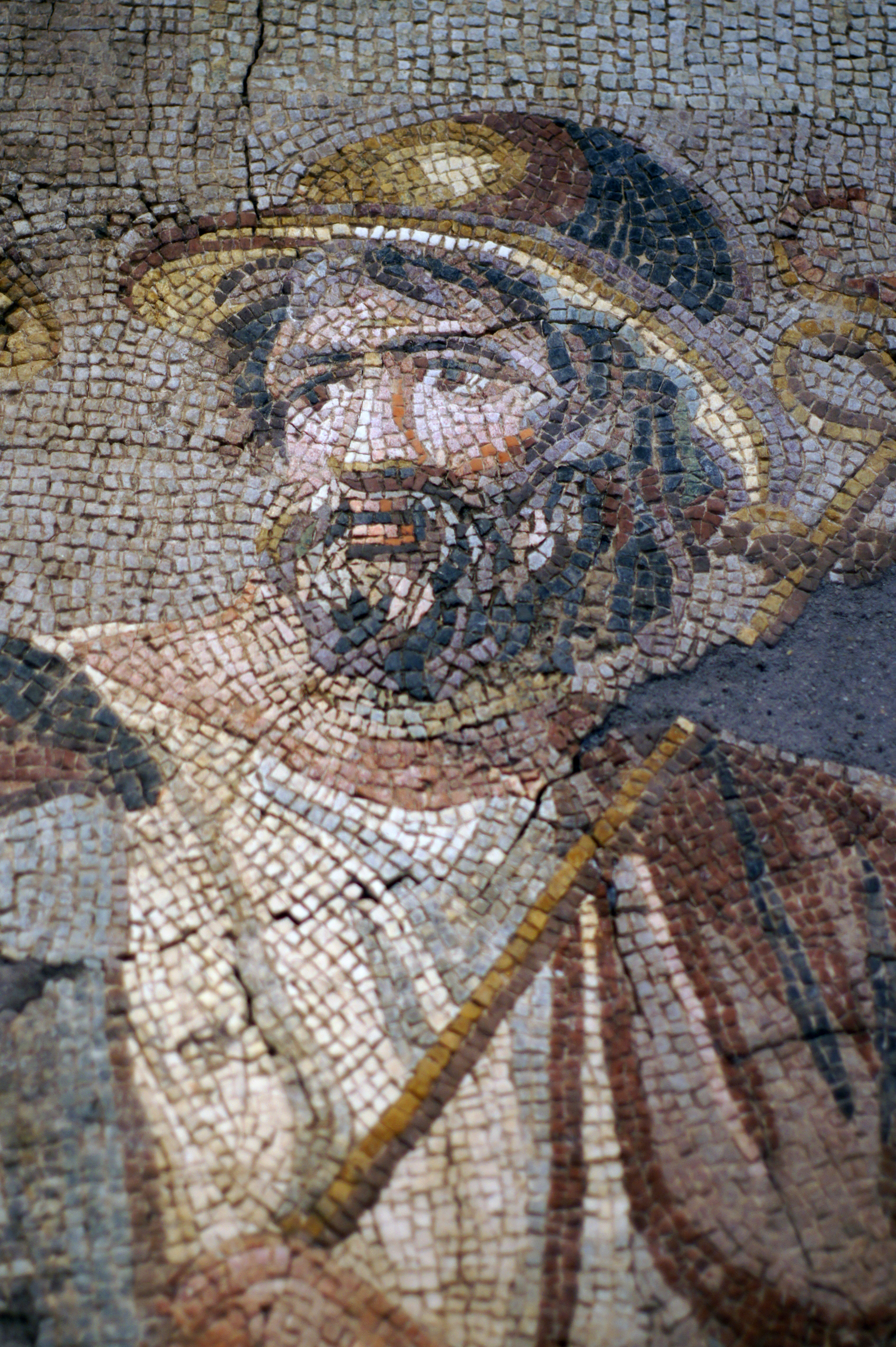
Eurybates on a Roman mosaic with the Removal of Briseis, 2nd century

In Greek mythology, Eurybates (/jʊˈrɪbətiːz/, Ancient Greek: Εὐρυβάτης) may refer to the same or different herald(s) for the Greek armies during Trojan War:

- Eurybates, from Ithaca, served as Odysseus's squire and herald. He was described by Odysseus to Penelope as "round-shouldered, dark-skinned, and curly-haired". Odysseus is said to pay him greater regard than any other of his companions for his honesty and faithfulness.
- Eurybates, a herald who was sent, along with Talthybius, by Agamemnon to retrieve Briseis from Achilles' camp in Iliad, I, but he might be a different person from Odysseus's herald mentioned in Iliad, 2 ("Eurybates of Ithaca"), and in the Odyssey.
