= List of minor planets: 493001–494000 =

The following is a partial list of minor planets, running from minor-planet number 493001 through 494000, inclusive. The primary data for this and other partial lists is based on JPL's "Small-Body Orbital Elements" and data available from the Minor Planet Center. Critical list information is also provided by the MPC, unless otherwise specified from Lowell Observatory. A detailed description of the table's columns and additional sources are given on the main page including a complete list of every page in this series, and a statistical break-up on the dynamical classification of minor planets.

Also see the summary list of all named bodies in numerical and alphabetical order, and the corresponding naming citations for the number range of this particular list. New namings may only be added to this list after official publication, as the preannouncement of names is condemned by the Working Group for Small Bodies Nomenclature of the International Astronomical Union.

Near-Earth obj.	MBA (inner)	MBA (outer)	Centaur
Mars-crosser	MBA (middle)	Jupiter trojan	Trans-Neptunian obj.
Unclassified

== 493001–493100 ==
Designation			Discovery			Properties		Ref
Permanent	Provisional	Named after	Date	Site	Discoverer(s)	Category	Diam.	Ref
493001	2014 SZ_{202}	—	October 12, 2005	Kitt Peak	Spacewatch	·	1.5 km	MPC · JPL
493002	2014 SN_{206}	—	November 26, 2003	Kitt Peak	Spacewatch	NYS	1.1 km	MPC · JPL
493003	2014 SL_{207}	—	December 25, 2010	Mount Lemmon	Mount Lemmon Survey	·	1.3 km	MPC · JPL
493004	2014 ST_{207}	—	March 29, 2008	Kitt Peak	Spacewatch	·	1.9 km	MPC · JPL
493005	2014 SC_{208}	—	September 19, 2003	Kitt Peak	Spacewatch	·	3.4 km	MPC · JPL
493006	2014 SD_{210}	—	August 22, 2004	Kitt Peak	Spacewatch	·	2.1 km	MPC · JPL
493007	2014 SP_{210}	—	September 30, 2003	Kitt Peak	Spacewatch	·	960 m	MPC · JPL
493008	2014 SH_{211}	—	November 5, 2010	Kitt Peak	Spacewatch	EUN	970 m	MPC · JPL
493009	2014 SG_{212}	—	July 14, 2013	Haleakala	Pan-STARRS 1	·	2.4 km	MPC · JPL
493010	2014 SW_{212}	—	September 20, 2014	Haleakala	Pan-STARRS 1	·	2.1 km	MPC · JPL
493011	2014 SB_{213}	—	April 21, 2012	Haleakala	Pan-STARRS 1	·	1.7 km	MPC · JPL
493012	2014 SG_{214}	—	April 2, 2006	Kitt Peak	Spacewatch	·	2.5 km	MPC · JPL
493013	2014 SH_{214}	—	September 4, 2014	Haleakala	Pan-STARRS 1	·	3.1 km	MPC · JPL
493014	2014 SU_{214}	—	December 5, 2010	Kitt Peak	Spacewatch	·	1.8 km	MPC · JPL
493015	2014 SW_{215}	—	January 26, 2011	Mount Lemmon	Mount Lemmon Survey	EOS	2.5 km	MPC · JPL
493016	2014 SF_{216}	—	July 1, 2013	Haleakala	Pan-STARRS 1	·	2.1 km	MPC · JPL
493017	2014 SJ_{217}	—	September 20, 2014	Haleakala	Pan-STARRS 1	·	2.8 km	MPC · JPL
493018	2014 ST_{217}	—	April 21, 2006	Kitt Peak	Spacewatch	EOS	2.2 km	MPC · JPL
493019	2014 SO_{218}	—	February 25, 2011	Mount Lemmon	Mount Lemmon Survey	EOS	1.6 km	MPC · JPL
493020	2014 SW_{218}	—	March 31, 2003	Kitt Peak	Spacewatch	·	2.3 km	MPC · JPL
493021	2014 SE_{219}	—	December 17, 2003	Kitt Peak	Spacewatch	·	3.2 km	MPC · JPL
493022	2014 SO_{219}	—	August 30, 2008	La Sagra	OAM	EOS	2.4 km	MPC · JPL
493023	2014 SR_{220}	—	September 20, 2014	Haleakala	Pan-STARRS 1	·	2.4 km	MPC · JPL
493024	2014 SU_{222}	—	May 16, 2005	Kitt Peak	Spacewatch	·	1.1 km	MPC · JPL
493025	2014 SY_{222}	—	September 14, 2014	Kitt Peak	Spacewatch	·	2.0 km	MPC · JPL
493026	2014 SL_{223}	—	August 22, 2014	Haleakala	Pan-STARRS 1	BRA	1.6 km	MPC · JPL
493027	2014 SM_{224}	—	March 15, 2008	Kitt Peak	Spacewatch	·	1.6 km	MPC · JPL
493028	2014 SX_{226}	—	January 17, 2007	Kitt Peak	Spacewatch	·	1.4 km	MPC · JPL
493029	2014 SC_{227}	—	September 18, 2014	Haleakala	Pan-STARRS 1	·	2.3 km	MPC · JPL
493030	2014 SG_{227}	—	January 4, 2011	Mount Lemmon	Mount Lemmon Survey	·	2.5 km	MPC · JPL
493031	2014 SJ_{229}	—	September 5, 2010	La Sagra	OAM	·	1.5 km	MPC · JPL
493032	2014 SD_{230}	—	April 13, 2012	Haleakala	Pan-STARRS 1	KOR	1.3 km	MPC · JPL
493033	2014 SK_{233}	—	February 1, 2009	Kitt Peak	Spacewatch	MAS	780 m	MPC · JPL
493034	2014 SL_{233}	—	October 26, 2005	Kitt Peak	Spacewatch	·	1.9 km	MPC · JPL
493035	2014 SA_{234}	—	September 18, 2001	Anderson Mesa	LONEOS	·	1.8 km	MPC · JPL
493036	2014 SG_{234}	—	April 18, 2007	Mount Lemmon	Mount Lemmon Survey	EOS	1.7 km	MPC · JPL
493037	2014 SA_{253}	—	March 2, 2012	Kitt Peak	Spacewatch	EOS	2.0 km	MPC · JPL
493038	2014 SM_{253}	—	September 25, 2009	Catalina	CSS	·	2.8 km	MPC · JPL
493039	2014 SR_{253}	—	November 8, 2010	Kitt Peak	Spacewatch	·	1.8 km	MPC · JPL
493040	2014 SH_{254}	—	October 4, 2006	Mount Lemmon	Mount Lemmon Survey	·	1.2 km	MPC · JPL
493041	2014 SU_{256}	—	October 18, 2009	Catalina	CSS	·	2.4 km	MPC · JPL
493042	2014 SA_{257}	—	September 2, 2014	Haleakala	Pan-STARRS 1	·	2.6 km	MPC · JPL
493043	2014 SG_{257}	—	September 12, 2007	Mount Lemmon	Mount Lemmon Survey	·	710 m	MPC · JPL
493044	2014 ST_{257}	—	August 17, 2009	Kitt Peak	Spacewatch	·	1.6 km	MPC · JPL
493045	2014 SA_{263}	—	August 22, 1999	Catalina	CSS	·	1.5 km	MPC · JPL
493046	2014 SJ_{263}	—	November 16, 2006	Mount Lemmon	Mount Lemmon Survey	·	1.4 km	MPC · JPL
493047	2014 SA_{264}	—	October 9, 2010	Mount Lemmon	Mount Lemmon Survey	·	1.5 km	MPC · JPL
493048	2014 SO_{265}	—	July 4, 2010	Mount Lemmon	Mount Lemmon Survey	·	950 m	MPC · JPL
493049	2014 SZ_{265}	—	September 19, 2014	Haleakala	Pan-STARRS 1	BRA	1.6 km	MPC · JPL
493050	2014 SX_{266}	—	July 5, 2014	Haleakala	Pan-STARRS 1	·	2.7 km	MPC · JPL
493051	2014 SU_{278}	—	October 5, 2005	Mount Lemmon	Mount Lemmon Survey	·	2.3 km	MPC · JPL
493052	2014 SP_{279}	—	April 13, 2012	Haleakala	Pan-STARRS 1	·	2.9 km	MPC · JPL
493053	2014 SW_{279}	—	March 13, 2011	Kitt Peak	Spacewatch	THM	2.6 km	MPC · JPL
493054	2014 SM_{280}	—	February 28, 2012	Haleakala	Pan-STARRS 1	·	1.7 km	MPC · JPL
493055	2014 SJ_{281}	—	November 15, 2003	Kitt Peak	Spacewatch	·	3.1 km	MPC · JPL
493056	2014 SN_{281}	—	September 22, 2014	Kitt Peak	Spacewatch	·	2.9 km	MPC · JPL
493057	2014 SO_{281}	—	November 5, 2010	Kitt Peak	Spacewatch	·	1.1 km	MPC · JPL
493058	2014 SR_{281}	—	November 20, 2009	Kitt Peak	Spacewatch	·	2.2 km	MPC · JPL
493059	2014 SV_{281}	—	September 22, 2014	Kitt Peak	Spacewatch	·	2.3 km	MPC · JPL
493060	2014 SY_{281}	—	December 13, 2009	Mount Lemmon	Mount Lemmon Survey	·	2.8 km	MPC · JPL
493061	2014 SF_{282}	—	October 25, 2005	Kitt Peak	Spacewatch	·	1.7 km	MPC · JPL
493062	2014 SK_{282}	—	November 6, 2010	Mount Lemmon	Mount Lemmon Survey	·	1.4 km	MPC · JPL
493063	2014 SP_{283}	—	October 24, 2003	Kitt Peak	Spacewatch	·	2.5 km	MPC · JPL
493064	2014 SD_{287}	—	October 18, 2003	Kitt Peak	Spacewatch	·	2.3 km	MPC · JPL
493065	2014 SK_{287}	—	September 2, 2014	Haleakala	Pan-STARRS 1	·	2.9 km	MPC · JPL
493066	2014 SP_{292}	—	September 28, 2003	Kitt Peak	Spacewatch	EOS	2.4 km	MPC · JPL
493067	2014 SC_{293}	—	September 23, 2009	Mount Lemmon	Mount Lemmon Survey	BRA	1.7 km	MPC · JPL
493068	2014 SE_{293}	—	April 17, 2010	WISE	WISE	T_{j} (2.94)	3.5 km	MPC · JPL
493069	2014 SH_{297}	—	March 15, 2012	Mount Lemmon	Mount Lemmon Survey	·	2.1 km	MPC · JPL
493070	2014 SV_{297}	—	August 1, 2009	Kitt Peak	Spacewatch	·	2.5 km	MPC · JPL
493071	2014 SX_{297}	—	November 18, 2003	Kitt Peak	Spacewatch	VER	2.6 km	MPC · JPL
493072	2014 SG_{299}	—	October 27, 2009	Kitt Peak	Spacewatch	EOS	1.9 km	MPC · JPL
493073	2014 SO_{300}	—	October 3, 2003	Kitt Peak	Spacewatch	EOS	1.6 km	MPC · JPL
493074	2014 SU_{300}	—	September 25, 2014	Kitt Peak	Spacewatch	·	2.9 km	MPC · JPL
493075	2014 SD_{301}	—	October 23, 2003	Kitt Peak	Spacewatch	·	2.6 km	MPC · JPL
493076	2014 SF_{301}	—	October 10, 2005	Kitt Peak	Spacewatch	·	2.0 km	MPC · JPL
493077	2014 SQ_{307}	—	April 19, 2012	Mount Lemmon	Mount Lemmon Survey	·	2.5 km	MPC · JPL
493078	2014 SB_{308}	—	November 1, 2008	Mount Lemmon	Mount Lemmon Survey	CYB	3.8 km	MPC · JPL
493079	2014 SU_{309}	—	October 23, 2009	Mount Lemmon	Mount Lemmon Survey	·	3.4 km	MPC · JPL
493080	2014 SP_{310}	—	March 25, 2006	Kitt Peak	Spacewatch	·	3.3 km	MPC · JPL
493081	2014 SX_{314}	—	September 26, 2003	Apache Point	SDSS	·	2.4 km	MPC · JPL
493082	2014 SZ_{314}	—	September 26, 2014	Kitt Peak	Spacewatch	CYB	3.0 km	MPC · JPL
493083	2014 SJ_{315}	—	March 13, 2012	Mount Lemmon	Mount Lemmon Survey	·	1.8 km	MPC · JPL
493084	2014 SC_{316}	—	April 15, 2013	Haleakala	Pan-STARRS 1	AEO	1.2 km	MPC · JPL
493085	2014 SM_{316}	—	September 2, 2014	Haleakala	Pan-STARRS 1	·	1.6 km	MPC · JPL
493086	2014 SQ_{317}	—	February 2, 2010	WISE	WISE	·	2.8 km	MPC · JPL
493087	2014 SC_{318}	—	September 3, 2008	Kitt Peak	Spacewatch	HYG	2.7 km	MPC · JPL
493088	2014 SW_{318}	—	October 25, 2005	Kitt Peak	Spacewatch	AST	1.5 km	MPC · JPL
493089	2014 SS_{319}	—	April 19, 2007	Mount Lemmon	Mount Lemmon Survey	·	2.2 km	MPC · JPL
493090	2014 SC_{320}	—	October 13, 2005	Kitt Peak	Spacewatch	(12739)	1.5 km	MPC · JPL
493091	2014 SF_{320}	—	October 25, 2005	Mount Lemmon	Mount Lemmon Survey	·	1.7 km	MPC · JPL
493092	2014 SL_{320}	—	September 19, 2001	Kitt Peak	Spacewatch	·	1.5 km	MPC · JPL
493093	2014 SY_{320}	—	March 26, 1995	Kitt Peak	Spacewatch	·	3.9 km	MPC · JPL
493094	2014 ST_{324}	—	October 1, 2005	Mount Lemmon	Mount Lemmon Survey	PAD	1.4 km	MPC · JPL
493095	2014 SL_{326}	—	November 1, 2010	Mount Lemmon	Mount Lemmon Survey	·	1.2 km	MPC · JPL
493096	2014 SP_{326}	—	September 30, 2003	Kitt Peak	Spacewatch	·	3.0 km	MPC · JPL
493097	2014 SB_{328}	—	December 13, 2009	Mount Lemmon	Mount Lemmon Survey	EMA	2.9 km	MPC · JPL
493098	2014 SO_{330}	—	October 2, 2003	Kitt Peak	Spacewatch	EOS	2.0 km	MPC · JPL
493099	2014 SR_{333}	—	September 19, 2014	Haleakala	Pan-STARRS 1	·	2.7 km	MPC · JPL
493100	2014 SL_{334}	—	November 3, 2005	Kitt Peak	Spacewatch	AGN	1.3 km	MPC · JPL

== 493101–493200 ==
back to top

Designation			Discovery			Properties		Ref
Permanent	Provisional	Named after	Date	Site	Discoverer(s)	Category	Diam.	Ref
493101	2014 ST_{337}	—	September 18, 2003	Anderson Mesa	LONEOS	·	2.8 km	MPC · JPL
493102	2014 SX_{338}	—	November 20, 2006	Kitt Peak	Spacewatch	·	1.3 km	MPC · JPL
493103	2014 SM_{341}	—	October 24, 2009	Kitt Peak	Spacewatch	·	1.7 km	MPC · JPL
493104	2014 SF_{345}	—	April 13, 2008	Kitt Peak	Spacewatch	·	1.9 km	MPC · JPL
493105	2014 SW_{347}	—	October 16, 2003	Kitt Peak	Spacewatch	·	3.9 km	MPC · JPL
493106	2014 SF_{348}	—	November 4, 2004	Kitt Peak	Spacewatch	·	510 m	MPC · JPL
493107	2014 SY_{348}	—	August 19, 2014	Haleakala	Pan-STARRS 1	·	1.2 km	MPC · JPL
493108	2014 TB_{4}	—	November 16, 2009	Mount Lemmon	Mount Lemmon Survey	·	2.0 km	MPC · JPL
493109	2014 TS_{6}	—	September 12, 2009	Kitt Peak	Spacewatch	AGN	1.2 km	MPC · JPL
493110	2014 TY_{6}	—	September 23, 2014	Kitt Peak	Spacewatch	EOS	1.7 km	MPC · JPL
493111	2014 TN_{7}	—	September 18, 2003	Socorro	LINEAR	·	1.1 km	MPC · JPL
493112	2014 TZ_{7}	—	October 18, 2009	Mount Lemmon	Mount Lemmon Survey	EOS	2.2 km	MPC · JPL
493113	2014 TG_{8}	—	August 30, 2005	Kitt Peak	Spacewatch	·	1.4 km	MPC · JPL
493114	2014 TH_{13}	—	October 1, 2014	Haleakala	Pan-STARRS 1	·	2.0 km	MPC · JPL
493115	2014 TT_{13}	—	September 3, 2014	Mount Lemmon	Mount Lemmon Survey	·	2.3 km	MPC · JPL
493116	2014 TK_{16}	—	April 3, 2010	WISE	WISE	CYB	4.8 km	MPC · JPL
493117	2014 TH_{21}	—	October 1, 2014	Kitt Peak	Spacewatch	·	2.3 km	MPC · JPL
493118	2014 TM_{24}	—	May 12, 2013	Haleakala	Pan-STARRS 1	MAR	930 m	MPC · JPL
493119	2014 TF_{26}	—	October 2, 2014	Kitt Peak	Spacewatch	·	3.0 km	MPC · JPL
493120	2014 TV_{26}	—	October 18, 2003	Kitt Peak	Spacewatch	·	2.6 km	MPC · JPL
493121	2014 TJ_{27}	—	March 27, 2008	Kitt Peak	Spacewatch	·	2.4 km	MPC · JPL
493122	2014 TX_{28}	—	January 28, 2007	Mount Lemmon	Mount Lemmon Survey	·	2.1 km	MPC · JPL
493123	2014 TE_{29}	—	November 4, 2005	Mount Lemmon	Mount Lemmon Survey	·	2.4 km	MPC · JPL
493124	2014 TG_{32}	—	April 12, 2010	WISE	WISE	·	4.7 km	MPC · JPL
493125	2014 TN_{36}	—	November 1, 2005	Kitt Peak	Spacewatch	·	2.0 km	MPC · JPL
493126	2014 TA_{38}	—	September 21, 2003	Kitt Peak	Spacewatch	EOS	2.0 km	MPC · JPL
493127	2014 TV_{38}	—	April 9, 2006	Kitt Peak	Spacewatch	·	3.4 km	MPC · JPL
493128	2014 TF_{39}	—	October 20, 2003	Kitt Peak	Spacewatch	·	3.0 km	MPC · JPL
493129	2014 TL_{39}	—	October 28, 2005	Mount Lemmon	Mount Lemmon Survey	AGN	1.2 km	MPC · JPL
493130	2014 TG_{40}	—	July 3, 2005	Mount Lemmon	Mount Lemmon Survey	·	1.3 km	MPC · JPL
493131	2014 TN_{40}	—	August 15, 2009	Kitt Peak	Spacewatch	AGN	1.2 km	MPC · JPL
493132	2014 TR_{42}	—	April 16, 2013	Haleakala	Pan-STARRS 1	ADE	2.3 km	MPC · JPL
493133	2014 TO_{43}	—	March 14, 2007	Mount Lemmon	Mount Lemmon Survey	·	2.2 km	MPC · JPL
493134	2014 TB_{44}	—	September 29, 1992	Kitt Peak	Spacewatch	·	1.9 km	MPC · JPL
493135	2014 TH_{44}	—	September 28, 2003	Kitt Peak	Spacewatch	·	2.5 km	MPC · JPL
493136	2014 TA_{45}	—	April 1, 2011	Mount Lemmon	Mount Lemmon Survey	CYB	3.8 km	MPC · JPL
493137	2014 TJ_{45}	—	October 22, 2009	Mount Lemmon	Mount Lemmon Survey	·	1.4 km	MPC · JPL
493138	2014 TT_{45}	—	November 15, 2003	Kitt Peak	Spacewatch	·	2.8 km	MPC · JPL
493139	2014 TO_{46}	—	March 16, 2007	Mount Lemmon	Mount Lemmon Survey	KOR	1.4 km	MPC · JPL
493140	2014 TX_{46}	—	November 18, 2003	Kitt Peak	Spacewatch	·	2.6 km	MPC · JPL
493141	2014 TZ_{46}	—	September 11, 2010	Mount Lemmon	Mount Lemmon Survey	·	1.4 km	MPC · JPL
493142	2014 TS_{47}	—	September 27, 2003	Kitt Peak	Spacewatch	·	2.4 km	MPC · JPL
493143	2014 TE_{48}	—	September 30, 2003	Kitt Peak	Spacewatch	EOS	1.6 km	MPC · JPL
493144	2014 TP_{51}	—	October 22, 2009	Mount Lemmon	Mount Lemmon Survey	EOS	1.8 km	MPC · JPL
493145	2014 TH_{52}	—	May 7, 2010	WISE	WISE	·	1.4 km	MPC · JPL
493146	2014 TN_{52}	—	September 17, 2009	Kitt Peak	Spacewatch	NAE	2.4 km	MPC · JPL
493147	2014 TE_{54}	—	August 4, 2013	Haleakala	Pan-STARRS 1	ANF	1.5 km	MPC · JPL
493148	2014 TL_{62}	—	March 9, 2011	Kitt Peak	Spacewatch	VER	2.9 km	MPC · JPL
493149	2014 TH_{65}	—	April 22, 2007	Kitt Peak	Spacewatch	·	2.6 km	MPC · JPL
493150	2014 TP_{66}	—	May 20, 2004	Kitt Peak	Spacewatch	·	2.3 km	MPC · JPL
493151	2014 TA_{67}	—	September 17, 2009	Kitt Peak	Spacewatch	EOS	2.1 km	MPC · JPL
493152	2014 TL_{67}	—	October 12, 1998	Kitt Peak	Spacewatch	·	2.9 km	MPC · JPL
493153	2014 TR_{67}	—	May 21, 2012	Mount Lemmon	Mount Lemmon Survey	·	3.1 km	MPC · JPL
493154	2014 TH_{68}	—	August 9, 2004	Siding Spring	SSS	·	2.4 km	MPC · JPL
493155	2014 TJ_{68}	—	September 30, 2014	Mount Lemmon	Mount Lemmon Survey	·	2.8 km	MPC · JPL
493156	2014 TX_{70}	—	January 5, 2000	Kitt Peak	Spacewatch	·	2.6 km	MPC · JPL
493157	2014 TG_{71}	—	May 1, 2012	Mount Lemmon	Mount Lemmon Survey	·	1.3 km	MPC · JPL
493158	2014 TS_{72}	—	April 28, 2012	Mount Lemmon	Mount Lemmon Survey	·	2.6 km	MPC · JPL
493159	2014 TY_{72}	—	January 31, 2006	Kitt Peak	Spacewatch	THM	2.8 km	MPC · JPL
493160	2014 TZ_{72}	—	October 19, 2003	Kitt Peak	Spacewatch	·	2.5 km	MPC · JPL
493161	2014 TZ_{73}	—	July 2, 2008	Mount Lemmon	Mount Lemmon Survey	·	1.7 km	MPC · JPL
493162	2014 TN_{74}	—	May 18, 2013	Mount Lemmon	Mount Lemmon Survey	·	1.3 km	MPC · JPL
493163	2014 TP_{74}	—	November 26, 2005	Kitt Peak	Spacewatch	·	2.1 km	MPC · JPL
493164	2014 TW_{74}	—	December 18, 2009	Kitt Peak	Spacewatch	·	2.7 km	MPC · JPL
493165	2014 TJ_{82}	—	May 12, 2013	Mount Lemmon	Mount Lemmon Survey	·	1.4 km	MPC · JPL
493166	2014 TU_{82}	—	July 29, 2009	Kitt Peak	Spacewatch	BRA	1.7 km	MPC · JPL
493167	2014 TY_{83}	—	October 14, 2001	Kitt Peak	Spacewatch	·	1.7 km	MPC · JPL
493168	2014 TL_{84}	—	October 7, 2005	Catalina	CSS	·	2.0 km	MPC · JPL
493169	2014 TN_{84}	—	February 19, 2010	WISE	WISE	·	4.2 km	MPC · JPL
493170	2014 TH_{85}	—	May 1, 2013	Mount Lemmon	Mount Lemmon Survey	·	2.9 km	MPC · JPL
493171	2014 UF_{1}	—	October 21, 2008	Mount Lemmon	Mount Lemmon Survey	·	3.0 km	MPC · JPL
493172	2014 US_{1}	—	September 22, 2003	Kitt Peak	Spacewatch	·	2.3 km	MPC · JPL
493173	2014 UX_{2}	—	April 1, 2008	Kitt Peak	Spacewatch	·	2.0 km	MPC · JPL
493174	2014 UE_{4}	—	May 15, 2012	Mount Lemmon	Mount Lemmon Survey	·	2.6 km	MPC · JPL
493175	2014 UR_{4}	—	October 3, 2014	Mount Lemmon	Mount Lemmon Survey	·	1.8 km	MPC · JPL
493176	2014 UF_{9}	—	April 27, 2012	Haleakala	Pan-STARRS 1	·	2.2 km	MPC · JPL
493177	2014 UC_{10}	—	October 16, 2014	Mount Lemmon	Mount Lemmon Survey	·	1.8 km	MPC · JPL
493178	2014 UU_{11}	—	December 10, 2009	Mount Lemmon	Mount Lemmon Survey	·	2.5 km	MPC · JPL
493179	2014 UB_{12}	—	November 24, 2009	Kitt Peak	Spacewatch	·	2.9 km	MPC · JPL
493180	2014 UJ_{12}	—	November 21, 2009	Mount Lemmon	Mount Lemmon Survey	NAE	2.3 km	MPC · JPL
493181	2014 UO_{13}	—	September 30, 2005	Mount Lemmon	Mount Lemmon Survey	·	2.2 km	MPC · JPL
493182	2014 UQ_{13}	—	September 30, 2003	Kitt Peak	Spacewatch	·	2.3 km	MPC · JPL
493183	2014 UJ_{14}	—	May 29, 2012	Mount Lemmon	Mount Lemmon Survey	·	2.9 km	MPC · JPL
493184	2014 UH_{15}	—	September 12, 2001	Kitt Peak	Spacewatch	·	1.3 km	MPC · JPL
493185	2014 UV_{15}	—	October 11, 2006	Palomar	NEAT	·	1.4 km	MPC · JPL
493186	2014 UW_{16}	—	October 20, 2003	Kitt Peak	Spacewatch	·	2.8 km	MPC · JPL
493187	2014 UB_{17}	—	October 4, 2004	Kitt Peak	Spacewatch	KOR	1.2 km	MPC · JPL
493188	2014 UN_{18}	—	April 30, 2012	Kitt Peak	Spacewatch	·	2.6 km	MPC · JPL
493189	2014 UE_{19}	—	October 28, 2005	Kitt Peak	Spacewatch	·	1.6 km	MPC · JPL
493190	2014 UQ_{19}	—	January 6, 2010	Mount Lemmon	Mount Lemmon Survey	·	2.5 km	MPC · JPL
493191	2014 UZ_{21}	—	April 7, 2008	Kitt Peak	Spacewatch	·	1.7 km	MPC · JPL
493192	2014 UK_{23}	—	June 10, 2012	Mount Lemmon	Mount Lemmon Survey	·	2.8 km	MPC · JPL
493193	2014 UT_{24}	—	September 24, 2008	Mount Lemmon	Mount Lemmon Survey	·	2.7 km	MPC · JPL
493194	2014 UE_{26}	—	August 28, 1995	Kitt Peak	Spacewatch	·	1.1 km	MPC · JPL
493195	2014 UU_{28}	—	February 14, 2008	Mount Lemmon	Mount Lemmon Survey	·	810 m	MPC · JPL
493196	2014 UM_{31}	—	August 20, 2008	Kitt Peak	Spacewatch	·	2.1 km	MPC · JPL
493197	2014 UT_{31}	—	March 7, 2010	WISE	WISE	·	4.2 km	MPC · JPL
493198	2014 UP_{32}	—	April 22, 2012	Kitt Peak	Spacewatch	·	2.7 km	MPC · JPL
493199	2014 UR_{37}	—	November 1, 2005	Mount Lemmon	Mount Lemmon Survey	·	1.8 km	MPC · JPL
493200	2014 UZ_{38}	—	March 26, 2007	Mount Lemmon	Mount Lemmon Survey	·	2.0 km	MPC · JPL

== 493201–493300 ==
back to top

Designation			Discovery			Properties		Ref
Permanent	Provisional	Named after	Date	Site	Discoverer(s)	Category	Diam.	Ref
493201	2014 UK_{40}	—	March 25, 2003	Mauna Kea	B. J. Gladman, J. J. Kavelaars	·	1.6 km	MPC · JPL
493202	2014 UE_{41}	—	February 20, 2006	Kitt Peak	Spacewatch	·	2.0 km	MPC · JPL
493203	2014 UQ_{41}	—	April 23, 2011	Haleakala	Pan-STARRS 1	·	3.6 km	MPC · JPL
493204	2014 UP_{42}	—	October 3, 2014	Mount Lemmon	Mount Lemmon Survey	·	2.5 km	MPC · JPL
493205	2014 UO_{45}	—	June 19, 2013	Haleakala	Pan-STARRS 1	·	1.4 km	MPC · JPL
493206	2014 UU_{46}	—	March 25, 2003	Kitt Peak	Spacewatch	GEF	1.3 km	MPC · JPL
493207	2014 UU_{47}	—	October 21, 2014	Kitt Peak	Spacewatch	·	2.6 km	MPC · JPL
493208	2014 UV_{47}	—	September 21, 2009	Mount Lemmon	Mount Lemmon Survey	·	2.2 km	MPC · JPL
493209	2014 UY_{47}	—	September 24, 2014	Mount Lemmon	Mount Lemmon Survey	·	1.2 km	MPC · JPL
493210	2014 UA_{48}	—	September 23, 2008	Mount Lemmon	Mount Lemmon Survey	THM	2.5 km	MPC · JPL
493211	2014 UF_{48}	—	November 9, 2009	Mount Lemmon	Mount Lemmon Survey	·	2.5 km	MPC · JPL
493212	2014 UJ_{48}	—	November 8, 2009	Mount Lemmon	Mount Lemmon Survey	·	3.4 km	MPC · JPL
493213	2014 UK_{48}	—	October 18, 2003	Kitt Peak	Spacewatch	·	3.1 km	MPC · JPL
493214	2014 UD_{51}	—	April 27, 2012	Haleakala	Pan-STARRS 1	·	2.4 km	MPC · JPL
493215	2014 UN_{51}	—	October 16, 2003	Socorro	LINEAR	·	2.3 km	MPC · JPL
493216	2014 UD_{52}	—	November 22, 2005	Kitt Peak	Spacewatch	AGN	1.4 km	MPC · JPL
493217	2014 UK_{53}	—	December 13, 2010	Kitt Peak	Spacewatch	AGN	1.3 km	MPC · JPL
493218	2014 UP_{59}	—	April 27, 2012	Haleakala	Pan-STARRS 1	·	3.1 km	MPC · JPL
493219	2014 UU_{60}	—	March 5, 2011	Mount Lemmon	Mount Lemmon Survey	·	1.3 km	MPC · JPL
493220	2014 UK_{61}	—	October 21, 2003	Kitt Peak	Spacewatch	·	2.8 km	MPC · JPL
493221	2014 US_{61}	—	October 23, 2003	Kitt Peak	Spacewatch	·	2.6 km	MPC · JPL
493222	2014 UT_{61}	—	October 2, 2014	Haleakala	Pan-STARRS 1	·	2.7 km	MPC · JPL
493223	2014 UL_{62}	—	September 16, 2003	Kitt Peak	Spacewatch	·	2.7 km	MPC · JPL
493224	2014 UL_{63}	—	September 18, 2003	Kitt Peak	Spacewatch	EOS	2.3 km	MPC · JPL
493225	2014 UV_{63}	—	September 19, 2001	Kitt Peak	Spacewatch	·	1.4 km	MPC · JPL
493226	2014 US_{66}	—	October 20, 2014	Kitt Peak	Spacewatch	·	2.3 km	MPC · JPL
493227	2014 UT_{66}	—	September 30, 2003	Kitt Peak	Spacewatch	EOS	1.7 km	MPC · JPL
493228	2014 UA_{68}	—	April 23, 2009	Mount Lemmon	Mount Lemmon Survey	·	1.8 km	MPC · JPL
493229	2014 UZ_{69}	—	September 27, 2003	Kitt Peak	Spacewatch	NYS	1.1 km	MPC · JPL
493230	2014 UQ_{70}	—	October 6, 1996	Kitt Peak	Spacewatch	·	2.0 km	MPC · JPL
493231	2014 UQ_{73}	—	December 31, 2011	Kitt Peak	Spacewatch	NYS	700 m	MPC · JPL
493232	2014 UT_{74}	—	October 11, 1997	Kitt Peak	Spacewatch	·	3.0 km	MPC · JPL
493233	2014 UL_{77}	—	October 19, 1998	Kitt Peak	Spacewatch	EOS	2.2 km	MPC · JPL
493234	2014 UT_{84}	—	September 23, 2008	Mount Lemmon	Mount Lemmon Survey	·	3.4 km	MPC · JPL
493235	2014 US_{85}	—	June 12, 2013	Mount Lemmon	Mount Lemmon Survey	·	3.3 km	MPC · JPL
493236	2014 UK_{86}	—	February 28, 2009	Kitt Peak	Spacewatch	MAS	810 m	MPC · JPL
493237	2014 UR_{89}	—	May 2, 2003	Kitt Peak	Spacewatch	·	2.5 km	MPC · JPL
493238	2014 UZ_{89}	—	November 1, 2005	Mount Lemmon	Mount Lemmon Survey	·	1.5 km	MPC · JPL
493239	2014 UH_{90}	—	October 26, 2008	Mount Lemmon	Mount Lemmon Survey	CYB	3.4 km	MPC · JPL
493240	2014 UT_{91}	—	August 31, 2014	Haleakala	Pan-STARRS 1	EOS	1.9 km	MPC · JPL
493241	2014 UA_{93}	—	April 24, 2006	Kitt Peak	Spacewatch	·	3.1 km	MPC · JPL
493242	2014 UC_{95}	—	April 22, 2007	Kitt Peak	Spacewatch	·	2.2 km	MPC · JPL
493243	2014 UJ_{96}	—	September 6, 2008	Mount Lemmon	Mount Lemmon Survey	·	2.8 km	MPC · JPL
493244	2014 UF_{97}	—	October 15, 2014	Kitt Peak	Spacewatch	·	1.8 km	MPC · JPL
493245	2014 UC_{98}	—	August 31, 2014	Haleakala	Pan-STARRS 1	·	2.9 km	MPC · JPL
493246	2014 UE_{98}	—	August 31, 2014	Haleakala	Pan-STARRS 1	·	1.8 km	MPC · JPL
493247	2014 UH_{98}	—	April 4, 2008	Mount Lemmon	Mount Lemmon Survey	·	1.9 km	MPC · JPL
493248	2014 UD_{99}	—	May 6, 2006	Kitt Peak	Spacewatch	·	3.0 km	MPC · JPL
493249	2014 UD_{101}	—	September 23, 2005	Kitt Peak	Spacewatch	·	1.8 km	MPC · JPL
493250	2014 UR_{102}	—	March 30, 2012	Mount Lemmon	Mount Lemmon Survey	·	1.8 km	MPC · JPL
493251	2014 UY_{106}	—	October 1, 2005	Mount Lemmon	Mount Lemmon Survey	·	1.9 km	MPC · JPL
493252	2014 UC_{107}	—	January 30, 2011	Haleakala	Pan-STARRS 1	·	2.1 km	MPC · JPL
493253	2014 UD_{107}	—	September 28, 2008	Mount Lemmon	Mount Lemmon Survey	·	2.7 km	MPC · JPL
493254	2014 UE_{109}	—	November 13, 2007	Kitt Peak	Spacewatch	·	690 m	MPC · JPL
493255	2014 UR_{111}	—	November 30, 2005	Mount Lemmon	Mount Lemmon Survey	AGN	1.1 km	MPC · JPL
493256	2014 UK_{112}	—	October 20, 2003	Kitt Peak	Spacewatch	·	1.3 km	MPC · JPL
493257	2014 UY_{112}	—	July 28, 2013	Haleakala	Pan-STARRS 1	VER	2.7 km	MPC · JPL
493258	2014 UZ_{114}	—	October 30, 2005	Catalina	CSS	·	2.6 km	MPC · JPL
493259	2014 UC_{118}	—	November 9, 2009	Mount Lemmon	Mount Lemmon Survey	·	3.1 km	MPC · JPL
493260	2014 UK_{118}	—	July 5, 2014	Haleakala	Pan-STARRS 1	·	2.4 km	MPC · JPL
493261	2014 UB_{119}	—	October 22, 2014	Kitt Peak	Spacewatch	·	2.4 km	MPC · JPL
493262	2014 UO_{119}	—	October 2, 2008	Mount Lemmon	Mount Lemmon Survey	EOS	2.0 km	MPC · JPL
493263	2014 UG_{125}	—	September 21, 2003	Črni Vrh	H. Mikuž, S. Matičič	·	3.1 km	MPC · JPL
493264	2014 UQ_{130}	—	December 2, 2010	Kitt Peak	Spacewatch	PAD	2.1 km	MPC · JPL
493265	2014 UG_{131}	—	February 25, 2012	Mount Lemmon	Mount Lemmon Survey	·	2.2 km	MPC · JPL
493266	2014 UQ_{132}	—	December 4, 2005	Mount Lemmon	Mount Lemmon Survey	·	1.8 km	MPC · JPL
493267	2014 UE_{133}	—	September 19, 2003	Campo Imperatore	CINEOS	EOS	1.9 km	MPC · JPL
493268	2014 UH_{134}	—	April 15, 2012	Haleakala	Pan-STARRS 1	EOS	1.9 km	MPC · JPL
493269	2014 UQ_{135}	—	November 8, 2009	Mount Lemmon	Mount Lemmon Survey	·	2.1 km	MPC · JPL
493270	2014 UC_{136}	—	October 6, 1996	Kitt Peak	Spacewatch	GEF	980 m	MPC · JPL
493271	2014 UT_{136}	—	October 3, 2014	Mount Lemmon	Mount Lemmon Survey	·	1.9 km	MPC · JPL
493272	2014 UY_{136}	—	October 3, 2014	Mount Lemmon	Mount Lemmon Survey	·	2.8 km	MPC · JPL
493273	2014 UZ_{141}	—	November 2, 2007	Kitt Peak	Spacewatch	·	670 m	MPC · JPL
493274	2014 UT_{142}	—	August 21, 2008	Kitt Peak	Spacewatch	·	2.3 km	MPC · JPL
493275	2014 UX_{142}	—	September 27, 2008	Mount Lemmon	Mount Lemmon Survey	·	2.7 km	MPC · JPL
493276	2014 UP_{143}	—	October 8, 2008	Mount Lemmon	Mount Lemmon Survey	·	2.2 km	MPC · JPL
493277	2014 UC_{147}	—	October 16, 2009	Mount Lemmon	Mount Lemmon Survey	·	2.0 km	MPC · JPL
493278	2014 UB_{153}	—	December 15, 2006	Kitt Peak	Spacewatch	·	990 m	MPC · JPL
493279	2014 UL_{153}	—	April 6, 2008	Kitt Peak	Spacewatch	AGN	1.2 km	MPC · JPL
493280	2014 UR_{153}	—	March 29, 2012	Haleakala	Pan-STARRS 1	·	2.0 km	MPC · JPL
493281	2014 UG_{157}	—	October 27, 2005	Catalina	CSS	GEF	1.4 km	MPC · JPL
493282	2014 UJ_{157}	—	March 28, 2012	Kitt Peak	Spacewatch	·	2.9 km	MPC · JPL
493283	2014 UO_{158}	—	April 27, 2012	Haleakala	Pan-STARRS 1	·	2.1 km	MPC · JPL
493284	2014 UH_{161}	—	November 2, 2010	Kitt Peak	Spacewatch	(5)	1.4 km	MPC · JPL
493285	2014 UC_{162}	—	September 21, 2003	Kitt Peak	Spacewatch	·	2.3 km	MPC · JPL
493286	2014 UA_{163}	—	October 16, 2014	Kitt Peak	Spacewatch	·	2.7 km	MPC · JPL
493287	2014 UP_{169}	—	July 29, 2008	Kitt Peak	Spacewatch	EOS	1.7 km	MPC · JPL
493288	2014 UU_{170}	—	August 30, 2014	Haleakala	Pan-STARRS 1	·	2.6 km	MPC · JPL
493289	2014 UH_{171}	—	July 16, 2013	Haleakala	Pan-STARRS 1	·	2.0 km	MPC · JPL
493290	2014 UG_{172}	—	July 1, 2013	Haleakala	Pan-STARRS 1	·	2.4 km	MPC · JPL
493291	2014 UE_{173}	—	October 28, 2014	Mount Lemmon	Mount Lemmon Survey	EUN	1.3 km	MPC · JPL
493292	2014 UN_{173}	—	September 16, 2009	Catalina	CSS	·	2.6 km	MPC · JPL
493293	2014 UT_{174}	—	October 28, 2014	Haleakala	Pan-STARRS 1	·	2.5 km	MPC · JPL
493294	2014 UQ_{176}	—	October 21, 2008	Mount Lemmon	Mount Lemmon Survey	·	2.6 km	MPC · JPL
493295	2014 UR_{177}	—	March 31, 2003	Kitt Peak	Spacewatch	·	2.4 km	MPC · JPL
493296	2014 UO_{179}	—	September 25, 2005	Kitt Peak	Spacewatch	AEO	1.3 km	MPC · JPL
493297	2014 UG_{180}	—	October 25, 2005	Mount Lemmon	Mount Lemmon Survey	AGN	1.1 km	MPC · JPL
493298	2014 UQ_{181}	—	November 10, 2010	Kitt Peak	Spacewatch	·	1.4 km	MPC · JPL
493299	2014 UW_{182}	—	August 31, 2014	Haleakala	Pan-STARRS 1	VER	2.6 km	MPC · JPL
493300	2014 UZ_{182}	—	May 12, 2010	WISE	WISE	·	1.3 km	MPC · JPL

== 493301–493400 ==
back to top

Designation			Discovery			Properties		Ref
Permanent	Provisional	Named after	Date	Site	Discoverer(s)	Category	Diam.	Ref
493301	2014 UM_{183}	—	March 1, 2010	WISE	WISE	·	4.1 km	MPC · JPL
493302	2014 UP_{183}	—	November 1, 2005	Kitt Peak	Spacewatch	·	1.8 km	MPC · JPL
493303	2014 UY_{183}	—	October 14, 2014	Kitt Peak	Spacewatch	·	2.4 km	MPC · JPL
493304	2014 UZ_{183}	—	February 20, 2002	Kitt Peak	Spacewatch	KOR	1.4 km	MPC · JPL
493305	2014 UF_{184}	—	March 1, 2010	WISE	WISE	·	3.9 km	MPC · JPL
493306	2014 UM_{184}	—	November 21, 2009	Kitt Peak	Spacewatch	·	3.8 km	MPC · JPL
493307	2014 UW_{184}	—	September 3, 2014	Mount Lemmon	Mount Lemmon Survey	(5)	1.4 km	MPC · JPL
493308	2014 UY_{184}	—	December 31, 2008	Mount Lemmon	Mount Lemmon Survey	·	700 m	MPC · JPL
493309	2014 UK_{189}	—	March 29, 2011	Mount Lemmon	Mount Lemmon Survey	·	2.8 km	MPC · JPL
493310	2014 UX_{189}	—	October 26, 2009	Kitt Peak	Spacewatch	KOR	1.4 km	MPC · JPL
493311	2014 UA_{190}	—	November 17, 2006	Mount Lemmon	Mount Lemmon Survey	·	1.0 km	MPC · JPL
493312	2014 UH_{190}	—	May 15, 2012	Haleakala	Pan-STARRS 1	EOS	2.0 km	MPC · JPL
493313	2014 UL_{190}	—	January 8, 2011	Mount Lemmon	Mount Lemmon Survey	·	3.1 km	MPC · JPL
493314	2014 UH_{191}	—	December 22, 2008	Kitt Peak	Spacewatch	·	710 m	MPC · JPL
493315	2014 UA_{194}	—	December 17, 2009	Mount Lemmon	Mount Lemmon Survey	·	2.9 km	MPC · JPL
493316	2014 UF_{195}	—	November 17, 2009	Mount Lemmon	Mount Lemmon Survey	·	2.5 km	MPC · JPL
493317	2014 UM_{195}	—	September 25, 2014	Kitt Peak	Spacewatch	·	1.7 km	MPC · JPL
493318	2014 UB_{196}	—	February 27, 2006	Kitt Peak	Spacewatch	·	3.0 km	MPC · JPL
493319	2014 UA_{199}	—	December 14, 2010	Mount Lemmon	Mount Lemmon Survey	·	1.8 km	MPC · JPL
493320	2014 UB_{201}	—	May 29, 2008	Mount Lemmon	Mount Lemmon Survey	·	2.2 km	MPC · JPL
493321	2014 UC_{202}	—	September 23, 2008	Mount Lemmon	Mount Lemmon Survey	·	3.1 km	MPC · JPL
493322	2014 UV_{202}	—	October 18, 2014	Kitt Peak	Spacewatch	·	2.1 km	MPC · JPL
493323	2014 UE_{207}	—	April 8, 2008	Kitt Peak	Spacewatch	·	1.8 km	MPC · JPL
493324	2014 UF_{207}	—	August 14, 2002	Kitt Peak	Spacewatch	HYG	3.0 km	MPC · JPL
493325	2014 UB_{208}	—	June 30, 2013	Haleakala	Pan-STARRS 1	·	2.1 km	MPC · JPL
493326	2014 UC_{209}	—	July 10, 2005	Siding Spring	SSS	EUN	1.4 km	MPC · JPL
493327	2014 UQ_{216}	—	April 28, 2012	Mount Lemmon	Mount Lemmon Survey	·	3.9 km	MPC · JPL
493328	2014 UT_{216}	—	June 15, 2004	Kitt Peak	Spacewatch	·	2.4 km	MPC · JPL
493329	2014 UX_{223}	—	September 26, 2000	Socorro	LINEAR	DOR	2.7 km	MPC · JPL
493330	2014 VB_{5}	—	October 18, 2006	Kitt Peak	Spacewatch	(5)	1.3 km	MPC · JPL
493331	2014 VT_{5}	—	September 7, 2008	Catalina	CSS	·	3.2 km	MPC · JPL
493332	2014 VM_{9}	—	March 9, 2011	Mount Lemmon	Mount Lemmon Survey	·	2.6 km	MPC · JPL
493333	2014 VL_{11}	—	April 18, 2010	WISE	WISE	·	3.9 km	MPC · JPL
493334	2014 VP_{11}	—	April 20, 2010	WISE	WISE	T_{j} (2.99)	3.6 km	MPC · JPL
493335	2014 VT_{12}	—	August 30, 2014	Haleakala	Pan-STARRS 1	·	2.2 km	MPC · JPL
493336	2014 VE_{15}	—	April 1, 2012	Mount Lemmon	Mount Lemmon Survey	·	3.5 km	MPC · JPL
493337	2014 VU_{17}	—	January 22, 2006	Mount Lemmon	Mount Lemmon Survey	KOR	1.3 km	MPC · JPL
493338	2014 VE_{19}	—	February 24, 2012	Kitt Peak	Spacewatch	·	2.0 km	MPC · JPL
493339	2014 VL_{21}	—	October 20, 2003	Kitt Peak	Spacewatch	EOS	2.1 km	MPC · JPL
493340	2014 VH_{22}	—	March 23, 2006	Catalina	CSS	EOS	2.8 km	MPC · JPL
493341	2014 VD_{29}	—	April 1, 2010	WISE	WISE	·	3.4 km	MPC · JPL
493342	2014 VO_{29}	—	May 4, 2006	Mount Lemmon	Mount Lemmon Survey	·	2.4 km	MPC · JPL
493343	2014 VT_{29}	—	September 27, 2006	Mount Lemmon	Mount Lemmon Survey	·	950 m	MPC · JPL
493344	2014 VU_{33}	—	April 27, 2012	Haleakala	Pan-STARRS 1	·	2.3 km	MPC · JPL
493345	2014 WS	—	September 26, 2008	Mount Lemmon	Mount Lemmon Survey	·	2.1 km	MPC · JPL
493346	2014 WS_{2}	—	August 31, 2014	Haleakala	Pan-STARRS 1	EOS	2.3 km	MPC · JPL
493347	2014 WO_{3}	—	March 5, 2008	Mount Lemmon	Mount Lemmon Survey	·	1.5 km	MPC · JPL
493348	2014 WX_{7}	—	August 30, 2005	Campo Imperatore	CINEOS	·	1.6 km	MPC · JPL
493349	2014 WC_{10}	—	April 13, 2013	Haleakala	Pan-STARRS 1	·	1.5 km	MPC · JPL
493350	2014 WU_{10}	—	October 22, 2014	Kitt Peak	Spacewatch	·	2.5 km	MPC · JPL
493351	2014 WQ_{18}	—	October 5, 2005	Catalina	CSS	·	1.7 km	MPC · JPL
493352	2014 WZ_{18}	—	January 16, 2011	Mount Lemmon	Mount Lemmon Survey	EOS	2.0 km	MPC · JPL
493353	2014 WH_{19}	—	March 6, 2010	WISE	WISE	·	3.7 km	MPC · JPL
493354	2014 WE_{21}	—	October 1, 2008	Mount Lemmon	Mount Lemmon Survey	·	3.2 km	MPC · JPL
493355	2014 WP_{23}	—	August 31, 2005	Kitt Peak	Spacewatch	·	1.3 km	MPC · JPL
493356	2014 WJ_{28}	—	September 24, 2008	Mount Lemmon	Mount Lemmon Survey	VER	2.5 km	MPC · JPL
493357	2014 WP_{28}	—	October 25, 2005	Mount Lemmon	Mount Lemmon Survey	·	1.7 km	MPC · JPL
493358	2014 WC_{44}	—	January 23, 2006	Mount Lemmon	Mount Lemmon Survey	·	1.8 km	MPC · JPL
493359	2014 WH_{48}	—	November 17, 2014	Haleakala	Pan-STARRS 1	·	1.8 km	MPC · JPL
493360	2014 WQ_{48}	—	October 5, 2013	Mount Lemmon	Mount Lemmon Survey	·	2.5 km	MPC · JPL
493361	2014 WC_{55}	—	July 9, 2013	Haleakala	Pan-STARRS 1	·	2.2 km	MPC · JPL
493362	2014 WH_{58}	—	April 26, 2008	Mount Lemmon	Mount Lemmon Survey	AEO	1.2 km	MPC · JPL
493363	2014 WL_{62}	—	September 24, 2014	Kitt Peak	Spacewatch	·	2.4 km	MPC · JPL
493364	2014 WT_{62}	—	August 31, 2014	Haleakala	Pan-STARRS 1	·	2.2 km	MPC · JPL
493365	2014 WV_{63}	—	May 2, 2013	Haleakala	Pan-STARRS 1	·	1.4 km	MPC · JPL
493366	2014 WW_{65}	—	September 22, 2008	Kitt Peak	Spacewatch	·	2.7 km	MPC · JPL
493367	2014 WD_{67}	—	April 21, 2006	Kitt Peak	Spacewatch	·	4.1 km	MPC · JPL
493368	2014 WM_{70}	—	May 2, 2008	Kitt Peak	Spacewatch	·	1.5 km	MPC · JPL
493369	2014 WH_{71}	—	May 21, 2012	Haleakala	Pan-STARRS 1	EOS	2.4 km	MPC · JPL
493370	2014 WC_{77}	—	August 15, 2009	Kitt Peak	Spacewatch	·	1.3 km	MPC · JPL
493371	2014 WD_{83}	—	July 14, 2013	Haleakala	Pan-STARRS 1	·	1.8 km	MPC · JPL
493372	2014 WM_{88}	—	March 30, 2011	Haleakala	Pan-STARRS 1	EOS	1.8 km	MPC · JPL
493373	2014 WU_{103}	—	March 23, 2012	Kitt Peak	Spacewatch	EOS	1.9 km	MPC · JPL
493374	2014 WA_{105}	—	August 20, 2009	Kitt Peak	Spacewatch	KOR	1.2 km	MPC · JPL
493375	2014 WE_{106}	—	April 15, 2013	Haleakala	Pan-STARRS 1	·	1.3 km	MPC · JPL
493376	2014 WK_{107}	—	November 19, 2009	Mount Lemmon	Mount Lemmon Survey	·	2.5 km	MPC · JPL
493377	2014 WO_{107}	—	September 23, 2014	Mount Lemmon	Mount Lemmon Survey	·	2.8 km	MPC · JPL
493378	2014 WT_{108}	—	October 18, 2007	Kitt Peak	Spacewatch	·	530 m	MPC · JPL
493379	2014 WO_{109}	—	November 21, 2009	Mount Lemmon	Mount Lemmon Survey	·	3.2 km	MPC · JPL
493380	2014 WX_{117}	—	February 21, 2010	WISE	WISE	·	4.2 km	MPC · JPL
493381	2014 WJ_{121}	—	April 20, 2012	Mount Lemmon	Mount Lemmon Survey	·	2.4 km	MPC · JPL
493382	2014 WO_{123}	—	February 10, 2011	Mount Lemmon	Mount Lemmon Survey	·	1.9 km	MPC · JPL
493383	2014 WV_{123}	—	August 22, 2007	Kitt Peak	Spacewatch	·	1.0 km	MPC · JPL
493384	2014 WX_{124}	—	November 20, 2006	Kitt Peak	Spacewatch	·	1.3 km	MPC · JPL
493385	2014 WP_{129}	—	January 23, 2011	Mount Lemmon	Mount Lemmon Survey	·	2.0 km	MPC · JPL
493386	2014 WX_{132}	—	April 30, 2012	Kitt Peak	Spacewatch	·	2.5 km	MPC · JPL
493387	2014 WX_{136}	—	November 5, 2010	Kitt Peak	Spacewatch	·	1.0 km	MPC · JPL
493388	2014 WN_{139}	—	May 10, 2012	Siding Spring	SSS	·	2.5 km	MPC · JPL
493389	2014 WO_{140}	—	April 19, 2007	Mount Lemmon	Mount Lemmon Survey	·	2.1 km	MPC · JPL
493390	2014 WA_{141}	—	September 4, 2008	Kitt Peak	Spacewatch	·	1.9 km	MPC · JPL
493391	2014 WM_{158}	—	October 2, 2014	Haleakala	Pan-STARRS 1	·	2.6 km	MPC · JPL
493392	2014 WC_{160}	—	September 3, 2008	Kitt Peak	Spacewatch	VER	2.5 km	MPC · JPL
493393	2014 WG_{160}	—	March 12, 2005	Kitt Peak	Spacewatch	V	610 m	MPC · JPL
493394	2014 WV_{160}	—	October 25, 2014	Haleakala	Pan-STARRS 1	·	3.1 km	MPC · JPL
493395	2014 WB_{162}	—	February 27, 2007	Kitt Peak	Spacewatch	·	1.8 km	MPC · JPL
493396	2014 WD_{163}	—	October 16, 1977	Palomar	C. J. van Houten, I. van Houten-Groeneveld, T. Gehrels	(5)	1.4 km	MPC · JPL
493397	2014 WX_{168}	—	July 1, 2013	Haleakala	Pan-STARRS 1	·	1.8 km	MPC · JPL
493398	2014 WA_{173}	—	April 25, 2007	Kitt Peak	Spacewatch	EMA	4.2 km	MPC · JPL
493399	2014 WE_{174}	—	December 21, 2006	Kitt Peak	Spacewatch	·	2.1 km	MPC · JPL
493400	2014 WT_{179}	—	November 16, 2009	Kitt Peak	Spacewatch	VER	3.5 km	MPC · JPL

== 493401–493500 ==
back to top

Designation			Discovery			Properties		Ref
Permanent	Provisional	Named after	Date	Site	Discoverer(s)	Category	Diam.	Ref
493401	2014 WT_{181}	—	September 3, 2010	Mount Lemmon	Mount Lemmon Survey	MAR	980 m	MPC · JPL
493402	2014 WA_{189}	—	April 20, 2010	WISE	WISE	·	2.6 km	MPC · JPL
493403	2014 WB_{189}	—	July 29, 2008	Mount Lemmon	Mount Lemmon Survey	NAE	2.2 km	MPC · JPL
493404	2014 WE_{190}	—	September 20, 2014	Haleakala	Pan-STARRS 1	·	2.9 km	MPC · JPL
493405	2014 WF_{192}	—	April 30, 2000	Anderson Mesa	LONEOS	·	4.8 km	MPC · JPL
493406	2014 WA_{193}	—	September 24, 2008	Kitt Peak	Spacewatch	·	2.5 km	MPC · JPL
493407	2014 WG_{193}	—	November 20, 2014	Haleakala	Pan-STARRS 1	·	3.9 km	MPC · JPL
493408	2014 WR_{193}	—	October 29, 2014	Haleakala	Pan-STARRS 1	·	2.0 km	MPC · JPL
493409	2014 WN_{198}	—	June 13, 2012	Haleakala	Pan-STARRS 1	·	1.9 km	MPC · JPL
493410	2014 WU_{198}	—	March 27, 2011	Mount Lemmon	Mount Lemmon Survey	·	3.0 km	MPC · JPL
493411	2014 WL_{199}	—	June 10, 2013	Mount Lemmon	Mount Lemmon Survey	·	2.4 km	MPC · JPL
493412	2014 WC_{211}	—	March 28, 2008	Mount Lemmon	Mount Lemmon Survey	·	1.5 km	MPC · JPL
493413	2014 WA_{215}	—	February 15, 2010	WISE	WISE	·	4.0 km	MPC · JPL
493414	2014 WD_{216}	—	October 29, 2014	Catalina	CSS	·	2.9 km	MPC · JPL
493415	2014 WL_{216}	—	March 14, 2010	WISE	WISE	·	3.0 km	MPC · JPL
493416	2014 WD_{218}	—	September 29, 2008	Mount Lemmon	Mount Lemmon Survey	·	2.4 km	MPC · JPL
493417	2014 WV_{240}	—	April 27, 2012	Haleakala	Pan-STARRS 1	·	1.6 km	MPC · JPL
493418	2014 WB_{250}	—	April 5, 2011	Mount Lemmon	Mount Lemmon Survey	·	2.9 km	MPC · JPL
493419	2014 WY_{251}	—	September 23, 2008	Catalina	CSS	·	3.1 km	MPC · JPL
493420	2014 WG_{253}	—	February 25, 2007	Mount Lemmon	Mount Lemmon Survey	·	2.1 km	MPC · JPL
493421	2014 WS_{259}	—	May 2, 2006	Kitt Peak	Spacewatch	T_{j} (2.92)	4.3 km	MPC · JPL
493422	2014 WT_{260}	—	October 1, 2008	Kitt Peak	Spacewatch	·	3.0 km	MPC · JPL
493423	2014 WT_{269}	—	April 25, 2011	Mount Lemmon	Mount Lemmon Survey	·	2.9 km	MPC · JPL
493424	2014 WE_{273}	—	August 4, 2013	Haleakala	Pan-STARRS 1	·	2.4 km	MPC · JPL
493425	2014 WS_{278}	—	February 10, 2011	Mount Lemmon	Mount Lemmon Survey	·	2.1 km	MPC · JPL
493426	2014 WF_{286}	—	December 18, 2009	Mount Lemmon	Mount Lemmon Survey	EOS	2.4 km	MPC · JPL
493427	2014 WN_{291}	—	September 25, 2001	Anderson Mesa	LONEOS	MAR · fast	1.6 km	MPC · JPL
493428	2014 WD_{293}	—	November 21, 2014	Haleakala	Pan-STARRS 1	·	2.7 km	MPC · JPL
493429	2014 WF_{299}	—	October 2, 2014	Haleakala	Pan-STARRS 1	·	2.7 km	MPC · JPL
493430	2014 WH_{315}	—	September 16, 2014	Haleakala	Pan-STARRS 1	·	3.5 km	MPC · JPL
493431	2014 WF_{321}	—	January 27, 2010	WISE	WISE	NAE	3.1 km	MPC · JPL
493432	2014 WA_{322}	—	March 12, 2010	WISE	WISE	·	4.7 km	MPC · JPL
493433	2014 WG_{322}	—	September 4, 2008	Kitt Peak	Spacewatch	EOS	1.7 km	MPC · JPL
493434	2014 WW_{325}	—	February 10, 2011	Mount Lemmon	Mount Lemmon Survey	·	1.6 km	MPC · JPL
493435	2014 WP_{326}	—	May 10, 2007	Mount Lemmon	Mount Lemmon Survey	EOS	1.8 km	MPC · JPL
493436	2014 WM_{329}	—	May 6, 2008	Mount Lemmon	Mount Lemmon Survey	·	2.6 km	MPC · JPL
493437	2014 WO_{336}	—	April 29, 2010	WISE	WISE	·	3.1 km	MPC · JPL
493438	2014 WH_{337}	—	October 7, 2008	Mount Lemmon	Mount Lemmon Survey	·	2.7 km	MPC · JPL
493439	2014 WE_{338}	—	June 18, 2013	Haleakala	Pan-STARRS 1	·	2.5 km	MPC · JPL
493440	2014 WA_{340}	—	July 29, 2009	Catalina	CSS	EUN	1.5 km	MPC · JPL
493441	2014 WM_{341}	—	October 18, 2009	Kitt Peak	Spacewatch	·	2.3 km	MPC · JPL
493442	2014 WW_{342}	—	July 15, 2013	Haleakala	Pan-STARRS 1	·	1.8 km	MPC · JPL
493443	2014 WQ_{346}	—	March 11, 2005	Mount Lemmon	Mount Lemmon Survey	·	3.0 km	MPC · JPL
493444	2014 WS_{349}	—	August 12, 2013	Haleakala	Pan-STARRS 1	EOS	1.9 km	MPC · JPL
493445	2014 WF_{353}	—	April 26, 2006	Cerro Tololo	Deep Ecliptic Survey	·	3.2 km	MPC · JPL
493446	2014 WJ_{361}	—	May 25, 2006	Mauna Kea	P. A. Wiegert	·	2.7 km	MPC · JPL
493447	2014 WK_{366}	—	April 15, 2008	Kitt Peak	Spacewatch	L5	10 km	MPC · JPL
493448	2014 WE_{375}	—	March 24, 2006	Mount Lemmon	Mount Lemmon Survey	·	2.5 km	MPC · JPL
493449	2014 WB_{376}	—	October 16, 2009	Mount Lemmon	Mount Lemmon Survey	·	1.8 km	MPC · JPL
493450	2014 WX_{383}	—	November 8, 2010	Mount Lemmon	Mount Lemmon Survey	EUN	1.4 km	MPC · JPL
493451	2014 WC_{388}	—	September 4, 2014	Haleakala	Pan-STARRS 1	·	2.3 km	MPC · JPL
493452	2014 WA_{389}	—	April 25, 2011	Mount Lemmon	Mount Lemmon Survey	·	2.8 km	MPC · JPL
493453	2014 WF_{392}	—	March 22, 2012	Catalina	CSS	·	2.9 km	MPC · JPL
493454	2014 WO_{392}	—	October 27, 2008	Catalina	CSS	·	4.0 km	MPC · JPL
493455	2014 WH_{394}	—	August 27, 2005	Siding Spring	SSS	·	2.0 km	MPC · JPL
493456	2014 WT_{400}	—	September 23, 2009	Mount Lemmon	Mount Lemmon Survey	GEF	1.1 km	MPC · JPL
493457	2014 WT_{403}	—	March 25, 2011	Catalina	CSS	·	3.3 km	MPC · JPL
493458	2014 WE_{409}	—	April 19, 2006	Kitt Peak	Spacewatch	EOS	2.0 km	MPC · JPL
493459	2014 WW_{412}	—	September 7, 2008	Mount Lemmon	Mount Lemmon Survey	EOS	2.2 km	MPC · JPL
493460	2014 WY_{416}	—	August 30, 2008	Socorro	LINEAR	·	2.0 km	MPC · JPL
493461	2014 WL_{422}	—	December 9, 2010	Mount Lemmon	Mount Lemmon Survey	GEF	1.5 km	MPC · JPL
493462	2014 WQ_{430}	—	November 17, 2009	Kitt Peak	Spacewatch	·	2.3 km	MPC · JPL
493463	2014 WU_{437}	—	November 20, 2003	Kitt Peak	Spacewatch	EOS	2.0 km	MPC · JPL
493464	2014 WJ_{450}	—	March 10, 2007	Mount Lemmon	Mount Lemmon Survey	·	1.2 km	MPC · JPL
493465	2014 WM_{454}	—	March 15, 2011	Mount Lemmon	Mount Lemmon Survey	·	3.4 km	MPC · JPL
493466	2014 WW_{462}	—	October 7, 2008	Mount Lemmon	Mount Lemmon Survey	EOS	1.8 km	MPC · JPL
493467	2014 WA_{486}	—	June 17, 2005	Mount Lemmon	Mount Lemmon Survey	·	2.0 km	MPC · JPL
493468	2014 WD_{488}	—	December 14, 2001	Socorro	LINEAR	·	580 m	MPC · JPL
493469	2014 WY_{493}	—	October 15, 2013	Kitt Peak	Spacewatch	·	2.5 km	MPC · JPL
493470	2014 WO_{499}	—	December 19, 2009	Kitt Peak	Spacewatch	·	2.9 km	MPC · JPL
493471	2014 WM_{500}	—	August 30, 2014	Haleakala	Pan-STARRS 1	·	3.4 km	MPC · JPL
493472	2014 WU_{510}	—	September 16, 2009	Kitt Peak	Spacewatch	L4	8.1 km	MPC · JPL
493473	2014 XC_{4}	—	October 18, 2009	Catalina	CSS	·	4.1 km	MPC · JPL
493474	2014 XH_{12}	—	October 26, 2008	Kitt Peak	Spacewatch	·	3.8 km	MPC · JPL
493475	2014 XT_{37}	—	October 7, 2008	Mount Lemmon	Mount Lemmon Survey	·	2.6 km	MPC · JPL
493476	2014 YV_{2}	—	March 27, 2011	Mount Lemmon	Mount Lemmon Survey	·	2.1 km	MPC · JPL
493477	2014 YN_{20}	—	October 3, 2003	Kitt Peak	Spacewatch	·	4.6 km	MPC · JPL
493478	2014 YC_{30}	—	October 8, 2008	Mount Lemmon	Mount Lemmon Survey	·	3.0 km	MPC · JPL
493479	2014 YB_{38}	—	November 21, 2014	Haleakala	Pan-STARRS 1	·	1.9 km	MPC · JPL
493480	2014 YZ_{49}	—	December 29, 2014	Haleakala	Pan-STARRS 1	cubewano (hot)	418 km	MPC · JPL
493481	2015 AT_{13}	—	September 27, 2013	Haleakala	Pan-STARRS 1	·	3.8 km	MPC · JPL
493482	2015 AH_{15}	—	October 3, 2013	Haleakala	Pan-STARRS 1	·	2.6 km	MPC · JPL
493483	2015 AE_{40}	—	August 27, 2006	Kitt Peak	Spacewatch	MAS	650 m	MPC · JPL
493484	2015 AU_{41}	—	October 31, 2008	Mount Lemmon	Mount Lemmon Survey	·	1.7 km	MPC · JPL
493485	2015 AV_{143}	—	March 10, 2007	Mount Lemmon	Mount Lemmon Survey	·	1.8 km	MPC · JPL
493486	2015 AE_{155}	—	September 25, 1995	Kitt Peak	Spacewatch	·	1.7 km	MPC · JPL
493487	2015 AM_{175}	—	December 18, 2009	Mount Lemmon	Mount Lemmon Survey	·	1.7 km	MPC · JPL
493488	2015 AE_{181}	—	October 4, 2004	Kitt Peak	Spacewatch	AGN	840 m	MPC · JPL
493489	2015 AN_{182}	—	October 3, 2013	Haleakala	Pan-STARRS 1	·	2.1 km	MPC · JPL
493490	2015 AZ_{186}	—	February 4, 2006	Mount Lemmon	Mount Lemmon Survey	·	1.3 km	MPC · JPL
493491	2015 AT_{190}	—	September 6, 2013	Kitt Peak	Spacewatch	·	1.5 km	MPC · JPL
493492	2015 AZ_{208}	—	April 29, 2006	Kitt Peak	Spacewatch	·	4.4 km	MPC · JPL
493493	2015 AZ_{220}	—	October 17, 1960	Palomar	C. J. van Houten, I. van Houten-Groeneveld, T. Gehrels	·	1.6 km	MPC · JPL
493494	2015 AY_{253}	—	January 12, 2010	Kitt Peak	Spacewatch	·	2.2 km	MPC · JPL
493495	2015 AY_{256}	—	January 1, 2009	Mount Lemmon	Mount Lemmon Survey	·	2.9 km	MPC · JPL
493496	2015 AY_{264}	—	October 3, 2013	Haleakala	Pan-STARRS 1	·	2.6 km	MPC · JPL
493497	2015 AR_{271}	—	February 26, 2012	Haleakala	Pan-STARRS 1	·	1.1 km	MPC · JPL
493498	2015 AB_{277}	—	November 1, 2013	Mount Lemmon	Mount Lemmon Survey	EOS	1.7 km	MPC · JPL
493499	2015 BO_{2}	—	October 24, 2008	Kitt Peak	Spacewatch	THM	1.8 km	MPC · JPL
493500	2015 BM_{10}	—	April 4, 2011	Mount Lemmon	Mount Lemmon Survey	HOF	2.4 km	MPC · JPL

== 493501–493600 ==
back to top

Designation			Discovery			Properties		Ref
Permanent	Provisional	Named after	Date	Site	Discoverer(s)	Category	Diam.	Ref
493501	2015 BR_{34}	—	October 4, 2004	Kitt Peak	Spacewatch	(12739)	1.4 km	MPC · JPL
493502	2015 BT_{59}	—	February 15, 2010	Kitt Peak	Spacewatch	·	1.9 km	MPC · JPL
493503	2015 BF_{61}	—	April 5, 2011	Mount Lemmon	Mount Lemmon Survey	·	2.1 km	MPC · JPL
493504	2015 BU_{87}	—	January 2, 2009	Mount Lemmon	Mount Lemmon Survey	HYG	3.1 km	MPC · JPL
493505	2015 BJ_{102}	—	September 11, 2007	Mount Lemmon	Mount Lemmon Survey	·	2.4 km	MPC · JPL
493506	2015 BX_{118}	—	January 28, 2007	Kitt Peak	Spacewatch	3:2	4.4 km	MPC · JPL
493507	2015 BW_{126}	—	October 8, 2008	Kitt Peak	Spacewatch	KOR	1.2 km	MPC · JPL
493508	2015 BH_{231}	—	March 26, 2007	Mount Lemmon	Mount Lemmon Survey	·	1.5 km	MPC · JPL
493509	2015 BT_{265}	—	October 25, 2008	Mount Lemmon	Mount Lemmon Survey	TEL	1.2 km	MPC · JPL
493510	2015 BG_{364}	—	December 13, 2006	Kitt Peak	Spacewatch	·	1.3 km	MPC · JPL
493511	2015 BM_{519}	—	August 12, 2010	Kitt Peak	Spacewatch	L4	9.8 km	MPC · JPL
493512	2015 CH_{3}	—	April 8, 2002	Kitt Peak	Spacewatch	HOF	2.8 km	MPC · JPL
493513	2015 CW_{6}	—	March 8, 2005	Mount Lemmon	Mount Lemmon Survey	·	1.4 km	MPC · JPL
493514	2015 CV_{15}	—	November 11, 2004	Kitt Peak	Spacewatch	AGN	1.2 km	MPC · JPL
493515	2015 CO_{21}	—	October 15, 2007	Mount Lemmon	Mount Lemmon Survey	·	2.0 km	MPC · JPL
493516	2015 CV_{60}	—	March 16, 2010	Mount Lemmon	Mount Lemmon Survey	·	2.8 km	MPC · JPL
493517	2015 DV_{12}	—	August 15, 2013	La Sagra	OAM	·	4.0 km	MPC · JPL
493518	2015 DV_{104}	—	March 26, 2006	Kitt Peak	Spacewatch	·	2.4 km	MPC · JPL
493519	2015 DG_{107}	—	October 5, 2013	Kitt Peak	Spacewatch	·	2.6 km	MPC · JPL
493520	2015 DO_{109}	—	April 4, 2005	Mount Lemmon	Mount Lemmon Survey	·	3.4 km	MPC · JPL
493521	2015 DO_{111}	—	October 11, 2007	Mount Lemmon	Mount Lemmon Survey	·	2.3 km	MPC · JPL
493522	2015 ER_{12}	—	February 11, 2004	Kitt Peak	Spacewatch	·	2.2 km	MPC · JPL
493523	2015 FJ_{3}	—	November 26, 2013	Mount Lemmon	Mount Lemmon Survey	·	3.0 km	MPC · JPL
493524	2015 FN_{38}	—	April 8, 2006	Mount Lemmon	Mount Lemmon Survey	·	2.0 km	MPC · JPL
493525	2015 FZ_{38}	—	April 14, 2004	Kitt Peak	Spacewatch	(31811)	2.7 km	MPC · JPL
493526	2015 FF_{40}	—	September 24, 2008	Kitt Peak	Spacewatch	L4	7.2 km	MPC · JPL
493527	2015 FT_{44}	—	October 8, 2012	Mount Lemmon	Mount Lemmon Survey	·	1.6 km	MPC · JPL
493528	2015 FZ_{71}	—	November 1, 2008	Mount Lemmon	Mount Lemmon Survey	MRX	1.0 km	MPC · JPL
493529	2015 FT_{73}	—	September 19, 2006	Kitt Peak	Spacewatch	·	600 m	MPC · JPL
493530	2015 FS_{77}	—	October 10, 2007	Kitt Peak	Spacewatch	KOR	1.5 km	MPC · JPL
493531	2015 FF_{112}	—	September 13, 2007	Mount Lemmon	Mount Lemmon Survey	L4 · ERY	9.0 km	MPC · JPL
493532	2015 FJ_{115}	—	September 15, 2009	Kitt Peak	Spacewatch	L4	9.7 km	MPC · JPL
493533	2015 FJ_{181}	—	October 22, 2009	Mount Lemmon	Mount Lemmon Survey	L4	6.7 km	MPC · JPL
493534	2015 FU_{206}	—	September 12, 2009	Kitt Peak	Spacewatch	L4 · ERY	7.3 km	MPC · JPL
493535	2015 FJ_{227}	—	September 12, 2009	Kitt Peak	Spacewatch	L4	6.7 km	MPC · JPL
493536	2015 FQ_{292}	—	October 7, 2007	Mount Lemmon	Mount Lemmon Survey	·	2.6 km	MPC · JPL
493537	2015 FB_{332}	—	February 25, 2011	Mount Lemmon	Mount Lemmon Survey	MAS	730 m	MPC · JPL
493538	2015 GM_{3}	—	March 14, 2007	Kitt Peak	Spacewatch	·	720 m	MPC · JPL
493539	2015 GB_{4}	—	December 10, 2010	Mount Lemmon	Mount Lemmon Survey	·	1.3 km	MPC · JPL
493540	2015 GG_{28}	—	January 30, 2006	Kitt Peak	Spacewatch	·	1.5 km	MPC · JPL
493541	2015 GE_{36}	—	May 19, 2010	Mount Lemmon	Mount Lemmon Survey	·	1.7 km	MPC · JPL
493542	2015 GJ_{50}	—	October 17, 2012	Haleakala	Pan-STARRS 1	·	1.1 km	MPC · JPL
493543	2015 HH_{19}	—	October 9, 2007	Kitt Peak	Spacewatch	·	2.3 km	MPC · JPL
493544	2015 HQ_{20}	—	March 10, 2003	Kitt Peak	Spacewatch	·	1.2 km	MPC · JPL
493545	2015 HD_{26}	—	September 17, 2006	Catalina	CSS	·	1.9 km	MPC · JPL
493546	2015 HZ_{26}	—	April 8, 2006	Mount Lemmon	Mount Lemmon Survey	·	1.9 km	MPC · JPL
493547	2015 HL_{56}	—	May 24, 2011	Haleakala	Pan-STARRS 1	·	1.3 km	MPC · JPL
493548	2015 HB_{62}	—	September 28, 2009	Kitt Peak	Spacewatch	·	1.1 km	MPC · JPL
493549	2015 HE_{148}	—	February 25, 2011	Mount Lemmon	Mount Lemmon Survey	MAS	760 m	MPC · JPL
493550	2015 HP_{174}	—	August 31, 2005	Kitt Peak	Spacewatch	·	1.3 km	MPC · JPL
493551	2015 HC_{175}	—	March 27, 2009	Catalina	CSS	·	3.2 km	MPC · JPL
493552	2015 HA_{179}	—	April 14, 2004	Anderson Mesa	LONEOS	·	3.5 km	MPC · JPL
493553	2015 JQ_{2}	—	October 18, 2012	Haleakala	Pan-STARRS 1	EUN	1.4 km	MPC · JPL
493554	2015 JL_{5}	—	October 18, 2012	Haleakala	Pan-STARRS 1	·	2.0 km	MPC · JPL
493555	2015 JH_{9}	—	April 10, 2005	Mount Lemmon	Mount Lemmon Survey	·	660 m	MPC · JPL
493556	2015 KT_{4}	—	September 15, 2012	Kitt Peak	Spacewatch	KON	2.1 km	MPC · JPL
493557	2015 KO_{5}	—	March 13, 2005	Kitt Peak	Spacewatch	·	2.5 km	MPC · JPL
493558	2015 KQ_{5}	—	November 20, 2001	Socorro	LINEAR	·	3.6 km	MPC · JPL
493559	2015 KW_{5}	—	October 9, 2012	Haleakala	Pan-STARRS 1	(1547)	2.0 km	MPC · JPL
493560	2015 KL_{19}	—	November 14, 2006	Mount Lemmon	Mount Lemmon Survey	·	2.3 km	MPC · JPL
493561	2015 KU_{19}	—	March 14, 2007	Kitt Peak	Spacewatch	NYS	1 km	MPC · JPL
493562	2015 KO_{20}	—	August 31, 2005	Kitt Peak	Spacewatch	HYG	3.1 km	MPC · JPL
493563	2015 KE_{21}	—	August 9, 2011	Haleakala	Pan-STARRS 1	·	1.8 km	MPC · JPL
493564	2015 KB_{38}	—	October 8, 2008	Mount Lemmon	Mount Lemmon Survey	·	1.2 km	MPC · JPL
493565	2015 KC_{38}	—	May 6, 2006	Mount Lemmon	Mount Lemmon Survey	·	1.8 km	MPC · JPL
493566	2015 KW_{40}	—	September 24, 2011	Haleakala	Pan-STARRS 1	·	2.9 km	MPC · JPL
493567	2015 KF_{42}	—	March 4, 2008	Mount Lemmon	Mount Lemmon Survey	·	820 m	MPC · JPL
493568	2015 KF_{43}	—	December 1, 2003	Kitt Peak	Spacewatch	·	2.0 km	MPC · JPL
493569	2015 KM_{45}	—	September 25, 2011	Haleakala	Pan-STARRS 1	EOS	1.9 km	MPC · JPL
493570	2015 KS_{45}	—	April 19, 2007	Mount Lemmon	Mount Lemmon Survey	3:2 · SHU	4.8 km	MPC · JPL
493571	2015 KH_{48}	—	February 28, 2014	Haleakala	Pan-STARRS 1	·	2.5 km	MPC · JPL
493572	2015 KD_{127}	—	March 24, 2006	Kitt Peak	Spacewatch	·	1.8 km	MPC · JPL
493573	2015 KB_{137}	—	September 27, 2006	Kitt Peak	Spacewatch	·	2.8 km	MPC · JPL
493574	2015 KB_{139}	—	September 25, 2011	Haleakala	Pan-STARRS 1	·	3.2 km	MPC · JPL
493575	2015 KY_{142}	—	October 20, 2006	Mount Lemmon	Mount Lemmon Survey	·	3.2 km	MPC · JPL
493576	2015 KE_{143}	—	January 23, 2006	Kitt Peak	Spacewatch	·	1.3 km	MPC · JPL
493577	2015 KG_{143}	—	January 24, 2007	Mount Lemmon	Mount Lemmon Survey	MAS	600 m	MPC · JPL
493578	2015 KZ_{144}	—	January 25, 2014	Haleakala	Pan-STARRS 1	HYG	2.4 km	MPC · JPL
493579	2015 KE_{154}	—	September 8, 2011	Kitt Peak	Spacewatch	·	1.8 km	MPC · JPL
493580	2015 LA_{6}	—	January 9, 2014	Mount Lemmon	Mount Lemmon Survey	·	1.1 km	MPC · JPL
493581	2015 LS_{8}	—	August 25, 2012	Haleakala	Pan-STARRS 1	·	1.2 km	MPC · JPL
493582	2015 LT_{31}	—	February 15, 2013	Haleakala	Pan-STARRS 1	VER	3.2 km	MPC · JPL
493583	2015 LZ_{36}	—	January 24, 2007	Mount Lemmon	Mount Lemmon Survey	·	1.1 km	MPC · JPL
493584	2015 LJ_{37}	—	October 23, 2009	Mount Lemmon	Mount Lemmon Survey	V	650 m	MPC · JPL
493585	2015 MU	—	November 14, 2012	Kitt Peak	Spacewatch	·	2.1 km	MPC · JPL
493586	2015 MV	—	March 6, 2011	Mount Lemmon	Mount Lemmon Survey	·	690 m	MPC · JPL
493587	2015 MU_{7}	—	January 28, 2007	Mount Lemmon	Mount Lemmon Survey	·	3.5 km	MPC · JPL
493588	2015 MK_{20}	—	November 19, 2007	Mount Lemmon	Mount Lemmon Survey	EOS	2.0 km	MPC · JPL
493589	2015 MS_{21}	—	October 19, 2012	Haleakala	Pan-STARRS 1	·	1.7 km	MPC · JPL
493590	2015 MV_{21}	—	August 26, 2011	Piszkéstető	K. Sárneczky	EOS	2.0 km	MPC · JPL
493591	2015 MD_{25}	—	November 19, 2003	Kitt Peak	Spacewatch	BRA	1.6 km	MPC · JPL
493592	2015 MC_{28}	—	October 22, 2012	Haleakala	Pan-STARRS 1	EOS	1.9 km	MPC · JPL
493593	2015 MB_{51}	—	September 5, 1999	Kitt Peak	Spacewatch	·	1.5 km	MPC · JPL
493594	2015 MD_{65}	—	February 10, 2008	Kitt Peak	Spacewatch	EOS	2.0 km	MPC · JPL
493595	2015 ML_{70}	—	November 1, 2005	Kitt Peak	Spacewatch	·	2.9 km	MPC · JPL
493596	2015 MS_{75}	—	September 3, 2010	Mount Lemmon	Mount Lemmon Survey	·	2.3 km	MPC · JPL
493597	2015 MQ_{76}	—	September 19, 2007	Kitt Peak	Spacewatch	·	1.4 km	MPC · JPL
493598	2015 MW_{76}	—	October 25, 2011	Haleakala	Pan-STARRS 1	EOS	1.8 km	MPC · JPL
493599	2015 MU_{83}	—	April 5, 2014	Haleakala	Pan-STARRS 1	EOS	1.7 km	MPC · JPL
493600	2015 MS_{89}	—	November 16, 2000	Kitt Peak	Spacewatch	·	2.6 km	MPC · JPL

== 493601–493700 ==
back to top

Designation			Discovery			Properties		Ref
Permanent	Provisional	Named after	Date	Site	Discoverer(s)	Category	Diam.	Ref
493601	2015 MO_{91}	—	July 19, 2010	WISE	WISE	·	2.1 km	MPC · JPL
493602	2015 MP_{92}	—	November 1, 2008	Mount Lemmon	Mount Lemmon Survey	·	950 m	MPC · JPL
493603	2015 MN_{95}	—	March 27, 2014	Haleakala	Pan-STARRS 1	·	1.5 km	MPC · JPL
493604	2015 MD_{104}	—	June 19, 2010	WISE	WISE	·	3.6 km	MPC · JPL
493605	2015 ME_{114}	—	October 21, 2011	Mount Lemmon	Mount Lemmon Survey	EOS	1.5 km	MPC · JPL
493606	2015 MG_{123}	—	December 1, 2010	Mount Lemmon	Mount Lemmon Survey	·	2.9 km	MPC · JPL
493607	2015 MO_{123}	—	October 25, 2011	Haleakala	Pan-STARRS 1	EOS	1.7 km	MPC · JPL
493608	2015 MZ_{125}	—	February 17, 2007	Mount Lemmon	Mount Lemmon Survey	·	3.4 km	MPC · JPL
493609	2015 NH_{8}	—	June 28, 2010	WISE	WISE	·	3.6 km	MPC · JPL
493610	2015 NY_{8}	—	September 20, 2011	Haleakala	Pan-STARRS 1	·	2.3 km	MPC · JPL
493611	2015 NU_{9}	—	September 21, 2008	Mount Lemmon	Mount Lemmon Survey	·	1.1 km	MPC · JPL
493612	2015 OC	—	September 26, 2011	Haleakala	Pan-STARRS 1	AGN	1.1 km	MPC · JPL
493613	2015 OR_{9}	—	October 4, 2006	Mount Lemmon	Mount Lemmon Survey	·	2.1 km	MPC · JPL
493614	2015 OZ_{11}	—	September 4, 2010	Mount Lemmon	Mount Lemmon Survey	·	2.9 km	MPC · JPL
493615	2015 OD_{15}	—	February 7, 2013	Kitt Peak	Spacewatch	EOS	1.7 km	MPC · JPL
493616	2015 OC_{19}	—	November 17, 2006	Kitt Peak	Spacewatch	·	3.9 km	MPC · JPL
493617	2015 OG_{20}	—	September 11, 2004	Socorro	LINEAR	LIX	3.1 km	MPC · JPL
493618	2015 ON_{41}	—	September 27, 2011	Mount Lemmon	Mount Lemmon Survey	·	1.3 km	MPC · JPL
493619	2015 OK_{70}	—	October 21, 2007	Mount Lemmon	Mount Lemmon Survey	·	2.0 km	MPC · JPL
493620	2015 OC_{76}	—	March 13, 2012	Mount Lemmon	Mount Lemmon Survey	·	3.0 km	MPC · JPL
493621	2015 PH_{9}	—	November 29, 1994	Kitt Peak	Spacewatch	·	1.0 km	MPC · JPL
493622	2015 PV_{9}	—	November 14, 2006	Kitt Peak	Spacewatch	·	2.0 km	MPC · JPL
493623	2015 PE_{21}	—	April 20, 2014	Mount Lemmon	Mount Lemmon Survey	·	2.1 km	MPC · JPL
493624	2015 PX_{24}	—	September 5, 2010	Mount Lemmon	Mount Lemmon Survey	·	1.7 km	MPC · JPL
493625	2015 PL_{29}	—	March 26, 2009	Kitt Peak	Spacewatch	·	1.8 km	MPC · JPL
493626	2015 PG_{34}	—	September 11, 2007	Mount Lemmon	Mount Lemmon Survey	H	460 m	MPC · JPL
493627	2015 PW_{35}	—	September 23, 2011	Haleakala	Pan-STARRS 1	·	1.5 km	MPC · JPL
493628	2015 PT_{41}	—	October 2, 2010	Kitt Peak	Spacewatch	·	2.3 km	MPC · JPL
493629	2015 PU_{48}	—	September 18, 2006	Kitt Peak	Spacewatch	HOF	2.1 km	MPC · JPL
493630	2015 PY_{48}	—	September 23, 2011	Kitt Peak	Spacewatch	HOF	2.5 km	MPC · JPL
493631	2015 PA_{69}	—	September 2, 2011	Haleakala	Pan-STARRS 1	·	1.8 km	MPC · JPL
493632	2015 PW_{75}	—	August 25, 2004	Kitt Peak	Spacewatch	·	2.8 km	MPC · JPL
493633	2015 PQ_{95}	—	June 22, 2004	Kitt Peak	Spacewatch	·	3.1 km	MPC · JPL
493634	2015 PO_{115}	—	September 24, 2011	Kitt Peak	Spacewatch	·	1.8 km	MPC · JPL
493635	2015 PZ_{124}	—	October 25, 2005	Mount Lemmon	Mount Lemmon Survey	critical	1.3 km	MPC · JPL
493636	2015 PG_{141}	—	September 24, 2011	Catalina	CSS	(1547)	1.1 km	MPC · JPL
493637	2015 PB_{179}	—	October 31, 2011	Mount Lemmon	Mount Lemmon Survey	·	1.6 km	MPC · JPL
493638	2015 PD_{221}	—	October 24, 2011	Mount Lemmon	Mount Lemmon Survey	·	1.9 km	MPC · JPL
493639	2015 PL_{239}	—	February 15, 2013	Haleakala	Pan-STARRS 1	·	3.1 km	MPC · JPL
493640	2015 PA_{253}	—	February 14, 2010	Kitt Peak	Spacewatch	·	970 m	MPC · JPL
493641	2015 PJ_{263}	—	January 18, 2013	Mount Lemmon	Mount Lemmon Survey	(1298)	2.5 km	MPC · JPL
493642	2015 PM_{294}	—	September 25, 1998	Kitt Peak	Spacewatch	H	590 m	MPC · JPL
493643	2015 PR_{302}	—	October 18, 2011	Haleakala	Pan-STARRS 1	·	1.1 km	MPC · JPL
493644	2015 QE_{7}	—	January 15, 2008	Mount Lemmon	Mount Lemmon Survey	·	1.9 km	MPC · JPL
493645	2015 QL_{9}	—	September 24, 1960	Palomar	C. J. van Houten, I. van Houten-Groeneveld, T. Gehrels	·	1.1 km	MPC · JPL
493646	2015 RM	—	December 25, 2005	Kitt Peak	Spacewatch	·	620 m	MPC · JPL
493647	2015 RB_{3}	—	July 25, 2006	Mount Lemmon	Mount Lemmon Survey	·	2.0 km	MPC · JPL
493648	2015 RX_{16}	—	December 24, 2005	Kitt Peak	Spacewatch	·	510 m	MPC · JPL
493649	2015 RS_{21}	—	January 7, 2006	Mount Lemmon	Mount Lemmon Survey	V	520 m	MPC · JPL
493650	2015 RU_{23}	—	March 4, 2013	Haleakala	Pan-STARRS 1	·	1.9 km	MPC · JPL
493651	2015 RY_{25}	—	March 6, 2008	Mount Lemmon	Mount Lemmon Survey	·	2.8 km	MPC · JPL
493652	2015 RW_{27}	—	January 19, 2008	Mount Lemmon	Mount Lemmon Survey	(5)	1.1 km	MPC · JPL
493653	2015 RJ_{31}	—	October 28, 2005	Socorro	LINEAR	·	670 m	MPC · JPL
493654	2015 RY_{37}	—	December 10, 2004	Kitt Peak	Spacewatch	·	1.0 km	MPC · JPL
493655	2015 RF_{50}	—	March 5, 2006	Kitt Peak	Spacewatch	·	960 m	MPC · JPL
493656	2015 RN_{53}	—	November 19, 2008	Mount Lemmon	Mount Lemmon Survey	·	1.1 km	MPC · JPL
493657	2015 RP_{83}	—	October 15, 2007	Kitt Peak	Spacewatch	H	530 m	MPC · JPL
493658	2015 RU_{84}	—	October 27, 2005	Mount Lemmon	Mount Lemmon Survey	·	3.5 km	MPC · JPL
493659	2015 RU_{86}	—	September 1, 2000	Socorro	LINEAR	·	1.1 km	MPC · JPL
493660	2015 RV_{89}	—	August 9, 2004	Anderson Mesa	LONEOS	·	1.0 km	MPC · JPL
493661	2015 RK_{90}	—	October 8, 2004	Anderson Mesa	LONEOS	MAS	650 m	MPC · JPL
493662	2015 RV_{93}	—	October 1, 2005	Catalina	CSS	·	920 m	MPC · JPL
493663	2015 RW_{96}	—	January 5, 2006	Kitt Peak	Spacewatch	·	610 m	MPC · JPL
493664	2015 RL_{98}	—	April 2, 2006	Kitt Peak	Spacewatch	·	1.6 km	MPC · JPL
493665	2015 RC_{101}	—	October 19, 2006	Mount Lemmon	Mount Lemmon Survey	EUN	900 m	MPC · JPL
493666	2015 RL_{102}	—	September 19, 2011	Catalina	CSS	·	1.5 km	MPC · JPL
493667	2015 RF_{108}	—	February 24, 2014	Haleakala	Pan-STARRS 1	H	560 m	MPC · JPL
493668	2015 RT_{108}	—	March 24, 2012	Kitt Peak	Spacewatch	·	3.2 km	MPC · JPL
493669	2015 RT_{114}	—	October 17, 2001	Kitt Peak	Spacewatch	·	640 m	MPC · JPL
493670	2015 RV_{122}	—	October 29, 2011	Haleakala	Pan-STARRS 1	EUN	1.1 km	MPC · JPL
493671	2015 RR_{123}	—	September 21, 2000	Kitt Peak	Spacewatch	MAS	610 m	MPC · JPL
493672	2015 RK_{191}	—	October 16, 2007	Kitt Peak	Spacewatch	·	1.1 km	MPC · JPL
493673	2015 RU_{193}	—	October 26, 2011	Haleakala	Pan-STARRS 1	·	980 m	MPC · JPL
493674	2015 RT_{213}	—	October 6, 2004	Kitt Peak	Spacewatch	NYS	850 m	MPC · JPL
493675	2015 RP_{222}	—	February 12, 2004	Kitt Peak	Spacewatch	·	1.2 km	MPC · JPL
493676	2015 RR_{222}	—	October 28, 2005	Mount Lemmon	Mount Lemmon Survey	·	500 m	MPC · JPL
493677	2015 RR_{229}	—	October 9, 2004	Kitt Peak	Spacewatch	·	1.2 km	MPC · JPL
493678	2015 RT_{232}	—	January 11, 2008	Catalina	CSS	·	1.7 km	MPC · JPL
493679	2015 RA_{236}	—	December 21, 2006	Mount Lemmon	Mount Lemmon Survey	·	1.4 km	MPC · JPL
493680	2015 RR_{236}	—	January 7, 2009	Kitt Peak	Spacewatch	·	1.1 km	MPC · JPL
493681	2015 RY_{236}	—	November 20, 2008	Mount Lemmon	Mount Lemmon Survey	·	1.3 km	MPC · JPL
493682	2015 RM_{238}	—	November 23, 2011	Catalina	CSS	·	1.3 km	MPC · JPL
493683	2015 RU_{243}	—	October 6, 2005	Catalina	CSS	·	700 m	MPC · JPL
493684	2015 SU_{1}	—	September 7, 2015	Catalina	CSS	THB	3.4 km	MPC · JPL
493685	2015 SD_{5}	—	November 4, 2004	Kitt Peak	Spacewatch	·	1.1 km	MPC · JPL
493686	2015 SR_{15}	—	October 25, 2000	Socorro	LINEAR	·	960 m	MPC · JPL
493687	2015 SD_{17}	—	April 2, 2006	Mount Lemmon	Mount Lemmon Survey	H	610 m	MPC · JPL
493688	2015 SH_{19}	—	October 25, 2011	Haleakala	Pan-STARRS 1	RAF	860 m	MPC · JPL
493689	2015 TV_{2}	—	November 21, 2008	Kitt Peak	Spacewatch	·	1.1 km	MPC · JPL
493690	2015 TE_{25}	—	December 29, 2008	Mount Lemmon	Mount Lemmon Survey	·	1.2 km	MPC · JPL
493691	2015 TV_{25}	—	January 20, 2009	Catalina	CSS	·	1.1 km	MPC · JPL
493692	2015 TB_{26}	—	September 2, 2008	Kitt Peak	Spacewatch	V	770 m	MPC · JPL
493693	2015 TW_{26}	—	November 29, 2005	Kitt Peak	Spacewatch	·	930 m	MPC · JPL
493694	2015 TY_{26}	—	December 5, 2007	Kitt Peak	Spacewatch	·	790 m	MPC · JPL
493695	2015 TK_{43}	—	January 2, 2000	Kitt Peak	Spacewatch	·	640 m	MPC · JPL
493696	2015 TL_{47}	—	October 19, 2006	Kitt Peak	Spacewatch	·	1.5 km	MPC · JPL
493697	2015 TM_{70}	—	August 28, 2005	Kitt Peak	Spacewatch	·	620 m	MPC · JPL
493698	2015 TS_{71}	—	February 16, 2010	Mount Lemmon	Mount Lemmon Survey	MAS	780 m	MPC · JPL
493699	2015 TZ_{71}	—	October 14, 2004	Kitt Peak	Spacewatch	·	2.6 km	MPC · JPL
493700	2015 TA_{72}	—	October 14, 2010	Mount Lemmon	Mount Lemmon Survey	·	1.5 km	MPC · JPL

== 493701–493800 ==
back to top

Designation			Discovery			Properties		Ref
Permanent	Provisional	Named after	Date	Site	Discoverer(s)	Category	Diam.	Ref
493701	2015 TS_{74}	—	September 9, 2015	Haleakala	Pan-STARRS 1	·	710 m	MPC · JPL
493702	2015 TD_{75}	—	March 13, 2007	Mount Lemmon	Mount Lemmon Survey	EOS	1.5 km	MPC · JPL
493703	2015 TP_{75}	—	November 19, 2008	Mount Lemmon	Mount Lemmon Survey	·	700 m	MPC · JPL
493704	2015 TJ_{81}	—	August 28, 2015	Haleakala	Pan-STARRS 1	·	2.0 km	MPC · JPL
493705	2015 TC_{83}	—	October 25, 2011	Haleakala	Pan-STARRS 1	·	1.2 km	MPC · JPL
493706	2015 TB_{87}	—	October 28, 2005	Mount Lemmon	Mount Lemmon Survey	·	660 m	MPC · JPL
493707	2015 TD_{101}	—	September 28, 2006	Kitt Peak	Spacewatch	·	1.3 km	MPC · JPL
493708	2015 TN_{107}	—	April 2, 2009	Mount Lemmon	Mount Lemmon Survey	·	1.7 km	MPC · JPL
493709	2015 TP_{108}	—	March 15, 2012	Mount Lemmon	Mount Lemmon Survey	·	1.6 km	MPC · JPL
493710	2015 TG_{109}	—	July 26, 2011	Haleakala	Pan-STARRS 1	·	720 m	MPC · JPL
493711	2015 TP_{111}	—	March 17, 2007	Kitt Peak	Spacewatch	·	640 m	MPC · JPL
493712	2015 TB_{112}	—	September 26, 2006	Mount Lemmon	Mount Lemmon Survey	·	1.3 km	MPC · JPL
493713	2015 TK_{112}	—	January 4, 2012	Mount Lemmon	Mount Lemmon Survey	·	1.3 km	MPC · JPL
493714	2015 TQ_{119}	—	June 22, 2014	Haleakala	Pan-STARRS 1	·	2.0 km	MPC · JPL
493715	2015 TL_{120}	—	September 27, 2006	Kitt Peak	Spacewatch	·	1.7 km	MPC · JPL
493716	2015 TL_{121}	—	June 1, 2010	WISE	WISE	·	2.2 km	MPC · JPL
493717	2015 TG_{125}	—	January 18, 2012	Kitt Peak	Spacewatch	DOR	1.7 km	MPC · JPL
493718	2015 TQ_{137}	—	January 17, 2013	Mount Lemmon	Mount Lemmon Survey	·	1.1 km	MPC · JPL
493719	2015 TE_{147}	—	March 29, 2014	Mount Lemmon	Mount Lemmon Survey	·	1.2 km	MPC · JPL
493720	2015 TB_{149}	—	September 25, 2008	Mount Lemmon	Mount Lemmon Survey	·	450 m	MPC · JPL
493721	2015 TG_{150}	—	October 1, 2008	Kitt Peak	Spacewatch	·	1.2 km	MPC · JPL
493722	2015 TB_{153}	—	August 23, 2011	Haleakala	Pan-STARRS 1	MAS	660 m	MPC · JPL
493723	2015 TN_{158}	—	October 15, 1996	Kitt Peak	Spacewatch	H	450 m	MPC · JPL
493724	2015 TZ_{158}	—	May 27, 2009	Kitt Peak	Spacewatch	·	1.4 km	MPC · JPL
493725	2015 TX_{165}	—	September 19, 2006	Catalina	CSS	·	1.4 km	MPC · JPL
493726	2015 TQ_{169}	—	September 9, 2015	Haleakala	Pan-STARRS 1	·	1.7 km	MPC · JPL
493727	2015 TC_{170}	—	December 3, 2012	Mount Lemmon	Mount Lemmon Survey	·	690 m	MPC · JPL
493728	2015 TN_{170}	—	September 7, 2008	Mount Lemmon	Mount Lemmon Survey	·	830 m	MPC · JPL
493729	2015 TA_{173}	—	October 9, 2015	Haleakala	Pan-STARRS 1	·	1.6 km	MPC · JPL
493730	2015 TM_{175}	—	April 2, 2013	Haleakala	Pan-STARRS 1	·	950 m	MPC · JPL
493731	2015 TO_{177}	—	October 28, 2008	Mount Lemmon	Mount Lemmon Survey	V	680 m	MPC · JPL
493732	2015 TP_{177}	—	August 23, 2004	Siding Spring	SSS	PHO	700 m	MPC · JPL
493733	2015 TU_{177}	—	September 23, 2008	Mount Lemmon	Mount Lemmon Survey	·	720 m	MPC · JPL
493734	2015 TK_{193}	—	September 14, 1998	Kitt Peak	Spacewatch	·	740 m	MPC · JPL
493735	2015 TP_{195}	—	December 6, 2011	Haleakala	Pan-STARRS 1	·	1.7 km	MPC · JPL
493736	2015 TU_{195}	—	October 1, 2011	Mount Lemmon	Mount Lemmon Survey	·	1.4 km	MPC · JPL
493737	2015 TL_{198}	—	October 3, 1997	Kitt Peak	Spacewatch	·	880 m	MPC · JPL
493738	2015 TJ_{200}	—	August 10, 1994	La Silla	E. W. Elst	RAF	1.0 km	MPC · JPL
493739	2015 TV_{201}	—	September 8, 2015	XuYi	PMO NEO Survey Program	·	3.1 km	MPC · JPL
493740	2015 TR_{202}	—	March 17, 2004	Kitt Peak	Spacewatch	·	1.6 km	MPC · JPL
493741	2015 TO_{203}	—	May 11, 1996	Kitt Peak	Spacewatch	H	480 m	MPC · JPL
493742	2015 TB_{204}	—	April 21, 2006	Mount Lemmon	Mount Lemmon Survey	·	1.1 km	MPC · JPL
493743	2015 TE_{205}	—	October 7, 2004	Socorro	LINEAR	MAS	620 m	MPC · JPL
493744	2015 TQ_{214}	—	January 2, 2009	Mount Lemmon	Mount Lemmon Survey	NYS	810 m	MPC · JPL
493745	2015 TB_{222}	—	October 24, 2011	Mount Lemmon	Mount Lemmon Survey	·	1.8 km	MPC · JPL
493746	2015 TZ_{224}	—	November 5, 2004	Kitt Peak	Spacewatch	·	3.5 km	MPC · JPL
493747	2015 TM_{234}	—	September 24, 2009	Mount Lemmon	Mount Lemmon Survey	·	3.4 km	MPC · JPL
493748	2015 TN_{243}	—	January 31, 2008	Catalina	CSS	·	1.4 km	MPC · JPL
493749	2015 TS_{249}	—	April 26, 2001	Kitt Peak	Spacewatch	MAR	1.0 km	MPC · JPL
493750	2015 TZ_{251}	—	August 31, 2011	Haleakala	Pan-STARRS 1	·	1.2 km	MPC · JPL
493751	2015 TR_{256}	—	January 13, 2010	WISE	WISE	·	2.4 km	MPC · JPL
493752	2015 TZ_{259}	—	September 26, 1998	Kitt Peak	Spacewatch	·	1.2 km	MPC · JPL
493753	2015 TL_{260}	—	April 25, 2006	Mount Lemmon	Mount Lemmon Survey	H	480 m	MPC · JPL
493754	2015 TV_{274}	—	October 26, 2011	Haleakala	Pan-STARRS 1	·	1.3 km	MPC · JPL
493755	2015 TA_{293}	—	October 1, 2005	Mount Lemmon	Mount Lemmon Survey	·	540 m	MPC · JPL
493756	2015 TP_{298}	—	December 5, 2010	Haleakala	Pan-STARRS 1	H	450 m	MPC · JPL
493757	2015 TU_{303}	—	March 3, 2006	Kitt Peak	Spacewatch	V	670 m	MPC · JPL
493758	2015 TA_{306}	—	May 11, 2010	Kitt Peak	Spacewatch	·	950 m	MPC · JPL
493759	2015 TC_{306}	—	November 13, 2007	Mount Lemmon	Mount Lemmon Survey	(5)	1.2 km	MPC · JPL
493760	2015 TQ_{311}	—	January 21, 2013	Haleakala	Pan-STARRS 1	·	1.5 km	MPC · JPL
493761	2015 TO_{314}	—	December 20, 2009	Mount Lemmon	Mount Lemmon Survey	·	540 m	MPC · JPL
493762	2015 TY_{319}	—	October 22, 2012	Haleakala	Pan-STARRS 1	·	580 m	MPC · JPL
493763	2015 TH_{321}	—	July 28, 2010	WISE	WISE	·	2.1 km	MPC · JPL
493764	2015 TY_{336}	—	July 31, 2000	Cerro Tololo	Deep Ecliptic Survey	·	1.2 km	MPC · JPL
493765	2015 TB_{337}	—	October 22, 2006	Catalina	CSS	·	1.6 km	MPC · JPL
493766	2015 TY_{345}	—	December 10, 2004	Kitt Peak	Spacewatch	·	1.1 km	MPC · JPL
493767	2015 TY_{348}	—	October 20, 2007	Mount Lemmon	Mount Lemmon Survey	·	1.3 km	MPC · JPL
493768	2015 TJ_{350}	—	October 23, 2004	Kitt Peak	Spacewatch	·	1.1 km	MPC · JPL
493769	2015 UD_{2}	—	March 14, 2013	Mount Lemmon	Mount Lemmon Survey	·	1.7 km	MPC · JPL
493770	2015 UG_{7}	—	October 23, 2011	Haleakala	Pan-STARRS 1	BRG	1.2 km	MPC · JPL
493771	2015 UH_{8}	—	September 24, 2008	Kitt Peak	Spacewatch	·	660 m	MPC · JPL
493772	2015 UP_{9}	—	March 12, 2002	Kitt Peak	Spacewatch	V	760 m	MPC · JPL
493773	2015 UT_{10}	—	November 18, 2008	Kitt Peak	Spacewatch	·	760 m	MPC · JPL
493774	2015 UD_{12}	—	September 24, 2006	Kitt Peak	Spacewatch	·	1.4 km	MPC · JPL
493775	2015 UN_{20}	—	April 18, 2007	Mount Lemmon	Mount Lemmon Survey	·	500 m	MPC · JPL
493776	2015 UH_{22}	—	December 30, 2007	Mount Lemmon	Mount Lemmon Survey	MIS	2.2 km	MPC · JPL
493777	2015 UQ_{25}	—	February 14, 2010	Kitt Peak	Spacewatch	·	630 m	MPC · JPL
493778	2015 UA_{27}	—	January 18, 2008	Mount Lemmon	Mount Lemmon Survey	·	1.2 km	MPC · JPL
493779	2015 UC_{39}	—	February 4, 2005	Mount Lemmon	Mount Lemmon Survey	·	930 m	MPC · JPL
493780	2015 UX_{39}	—	August 27, 2011	Haleakala	Pan-STARRS 1	MAS	630 m	MPC · JPL
493781	2015 UE_{40}	—	October 8, 2007	Mount Lemmon	Mount Lemmon Survey	·	750 m	MPC · JPL
493782	2015 UT_{42}	—	January 30, 2012	Mount Lemmon	Mount Lemmon Survey	·	2.7 km	MPC · JPL
493783	2015 UX_{43}	—	March 2, 2012	Kitt Peak	Spacewatch	·	2.6 km	MPC · JPL
493784	2015 UE_{45}	—	February 8, 2013	Haleakala	Pan-STARRS 1	·	1.0 km	MPC · JPL
493785	2015 UL_{46}	—	April 12, 2013	Mount Lemmon	Mount Lemmon Survey	·	1.3 km	MPC · JPL
493786	2015 UL_{48}	—	January 2, 2009	Mount Lemmon	Mount Lemmon Survey	·	1.1 km	MPC · JPL
493787	2015 UM_{48}	—	December 25, 2006	Anderson Mesa	LONEOS	·	2.1 km	MPC · JPL
493788	2015 UT_{55}	—	April 2, 2009	Kitt Peak	Spacewatch	·	2.1 km	MPC · JPL
493789	2015 UG_{63}	—	May 22, 2011	Mount Lemmon	Mount Lemmon Survey	T_{j} (2.99)	3.1 km	MPC · JPL
493790	2015 UL_{66}	—	January 21, 2010	WISE	WISE	·	2.6 km	MPC · JPL
493791	2015 UO_{68}	—	August 30, 2005	Kitt Peak	Spacewatch	·	580 m	MPC · JPL
493792	2015 UX_{68}	—	August 30, 2011	Kitt Peak	Spacewatch	CLA	1.1 km	MPC · JPL
493793	2015 UM_{72}	—	December 12, 2004	Kitt Peak	Spacewatch	·	1.1 km	MPC · JPL
493794	2015 UJ_{80}	—	February 1, 2005	Catalina	CSS	·	2.4 km	MPC · JPL
493795	2015 UV_{81}	—	January 30, 2011	Catalina	CSS	T_{j} (2.96)	3.4 km	MPC · JPL
493796	2015 UP_{83}	—	September 10, 2004	Socorro	LINEAR	H	610 m	MPC · JPL
493797	2015 VZ_{5}	—	August 4, 2002	Palomar	NEAT	EUN	1.3 km	MPC · JPL
493798	2015 VK_{6}	—	December 3, 2010	Catalina	CSS	·	3.6 km	MPC · JPL
493799	2015 VR_{24}	—	November 18, 2008	Kitt Peak	Spacewatch	V	740 m	MPC · JPL
493800	2015 VX_{25}	—	February 2, 2009	Mount Lemmon	Mount Lemmon Survey	·	1.4 km	MPC · JPL

== 493801–493900 ==
back to top

Designation			Discovery			Properties		Ref
Permanent	Provisional	Named after	Date	Site	Discoverer(s)	Category	Diam.	Ref
493801	2015 VM_{28}	—	October 9, 2004	Kitt Peak	Spacewatch	·	1.2 km	MPC · JPL
493802	2015 VV_{29}	—	February 27, 2009	Catalina	CSS	·	2.2 km	MPC · JPL
493803	2015 VL_{38}	—	October 20, 2001	Kitt Peak	Spacewatch	·	1.9 km	MPC · JPL
493804	2015 VO_{41}	—	April 30, 2009	Mount Lemmon	Mount Lemmon Survey	EUN	1.2 km	MPC · JPL
493805	2015 VH_{55}	—	January 10, 2013	Haleakala	Pan-STARRS 1	·	840 m	MPC · JPL
493806	2015 VV_{63}	—	November 18, 2011	Kitt Peak	Spacewatch	·	1.6 km	MPC · JPL
493807	2015 VB_{67}	—	September 9, 2004	Socorro	LINEAR	NYS	980 m	MPC · JPL
493808	2015 VV_{67}	—	June 13, 2004	Kitt Peak	Spacewatch	H	510 m	MPC · JPL
493809	2015 VT_{72}	—	November 11, 1998	Anderson Mesa	LONEOS	·	1.4 km	MPC · JPL
493810	2015 VK_{74}	—	November 3, 2005	Catalina	CSS	·	570 m	MPC · JPL
493811	2015 VF_{83}	—	March 23, 2006	Mount Lemmon	Mount Lemmon Survey	PHO	2.2 km	MPC · JPL
493812	2015 VV_{95}	—	November 29, 2000	Kitt Peak	Spacewatch	V	790 m	MPC · JPL
493813	2015 VT_{96}	—	April 19, 2006	Mount Lemmon	Mount Lemmon Survey	·	820 m	MPC · JPL
493814	2015 VY_{97}	—	April 21, 2009	Mount Lemmon	Mount Lemmon Survey	·	1.2 km	MPC · JPL
493815	2015 VX_{98}	—	January 13, 2005	Kitt Peak	Spacewatch	NYS	1.3 km	MPC · JPL
493816	2015 VL_{101}	—	December 21, 2012	Mount Lemmon	Mount Lemmon Survey	·	640 m	MPC · JPL
493817	2015 VC_{102}	—	April 19, 2009	Kitt Peak	Spacewatch	·	1.2 km	MPC · JPL
493818	2015 VK_{102}	—	October 9, 2004	Kitt Peak	Spacewatch	·	1.1 km	MPC · JPL
493819	2015 VN_{112}	—	October 15, 2002	Palomar	NEAT	·	3.3 km	MPC · JPL
493820	2015 VU_{113}	—	August 17, 2009	Kitt Peak	Spacewatch	·	2.1 km	MPC · JPL
493821	2015 VD_{114}	—	January 30, 2004	Kitt Peak	Spacewatch	·	1.2 km	MPC · JPL
493822	2015 VJ_{118}	—	November 3, 2008	Mount Lemmon	Mount Lemmon Survey	·	800 m	MPC · JPL
493823	2015 VK_{119}	—	December 10, 2004	Kitt Peak	Spacewatch	·	1.5 km	MPC · JPL
493824	2015 VR_{119}	—	November 9, 2004	Catalina	CSS	·	2.8 km	MPC · JPL
493825	2015 VC_{120}	—	June 19, 2010	Mount Lemmon	Mount Lemmon Survey	·	1.4 km	MPC · JPL
493826	2015 VV_{120}	—	December 16, 2003	Kitt Peak	Spacewatch	·	1.5 km	MPC · JPL
493827	2015 VY_{120}	—	November 26, 2011	Kitt Peak	Spacewatch	·	1.5 km	MPC · JPL
493828	2015 VZ_{122}	—	September 13, 2007	Catalina	CSS	PHO	890 m	MPC · JPL
493829	2015 VB_{124}	—	April 26, 2010	WISE	WISE	·	1.7 km	MPC · JPL
493830	2015 VC_{127}	—	September 20, 2011	Haleakala	Pan-STARRS 1	PHO	1.2 km	MPC · JPL
493831	2015 VA_{129}	—	April 10, 2013	Haleakala	Pan-STARRS 1	·	1.5 km	MPC · JPL
493832	2015 VF_{129}	—	February 11, 2004	Kitt Peak	Spacewatch	EUN	1.0 km	MPC · JPL
493833	2015 VL_{129}	—	March 25, 2012	Mount Lemmon	Mount Lemmon Survey	·	2.9 km	MPC · JPL
493834	2015 VS_{131}	—	November 28, 2010	Kitt Peak	Spacewatch	·	2.9 km	MPC · JPL
493835	2015 VT_{133}	—	August 1, 2011	Siding Spring	SSS	·	1.4 km	MPC · JPL
493836	2015 VT_{136}	—	November 4, 2010	Mount Lemmon	Mount Lemmon Survey	·	1.8 km	MPC · JPL
493837	2015 VO_{141}	—	September 17, 2011	La Sagra	OAM	V	780 m	MPC · JPL
493838	2015 VT_{146}	—	January 2, 2012	Mount Lemmon	Mount Lemmon Survey	EUN	1.2 km	MPC · JPL
493839	2015 VK_{150}	—	September 15, 2014	Haleakala	Pan-STARRS 1	·	3.0 km	MPC · JPL
493840	2015 WP	—	January 26, 2006	Mount Lemmon	Mount Lemmon Survey	V	610 m	MPC · JPL
493841	2015 WA_{3}	—	September 17, 2004	Kitt Peak	Spacewatch	·	850 m	MPC · JPL
493842	2015 WK_{6}	—	October 6, 2004	Kitt Peak	Spacewatch	·	1.8 km	MPC · JPL
493843	2015 WS_{6}	—	January 29, 2004	Socorro	LINEAR	(5)	1.2 km	MPC · JPL
493844	2015 WT_{9}	—	February 2, 2006	Kitt Peak	Spacewatch	·	2.6 km	MPC · JPL
493845	2015 WF_{15}	—	December 10, 2004	Socorro	LINEAR	·	2.3 km	MPC · JPL
493846	2015 WT_{15}	—	December 29, 2011	Mount Lemmon	Mount Lemmon Survey	EUN	1.0 km	MPC · JPL
493847	2015 XA_{9}	—	October 4, 2006	Mount Lemmon	Mount Lemmon Survey	EUN	1.5 km	MPC · JPL
493848	2015 XB_{10}	—	September 6, 2008	Mount Lemmon	Mount Lemmon Survey	·	640 m	MPC · JPL
493849	2015 XC_{27}	—	February 20, 2009	Kitt Peak	Spacewatch	·	1.3 km	MPC · JPL
493850	2015 XQ_{31}	—	April 17, 2009	Mount Lemmon	Mount Lemmon Survey	MAR	770 m	MPC · JPL
493851	2015 XP_{37}	—	February 28, 2008	Kitt Peak	Spacewatch	·	2.1 km	MPC · JPL
493852	2015 XX_{40}	—	November 4, 2004	Kitt Peak	Spacewatch	·	1.9 km	MPC · JPL
493853	2015 XC_{54}	—	August 18, 2014	Haleakala	Pan-STARRS 1	·	1.4 km	MPC · JPL
493854	2015 XJ_{56}	—	October 19, 2006	Kitt Peak	Deep Ecliptic Survey	(5)	920 m	MPC · JPL
493855	2015 XC_{57}	—	June 5, 2014	Haleakala	Pan-STARRS 1	·	1.3 km	MPC · JPL
493856	2015 XJ_{57}	—	October 22, 2011	Mount Lemmon	Mount Lemmon Survey	·	1.6 km	MPC · JPL
493857	2015 XU_{57}	—	July 26, 2011	Haleakala	Pan-STARRS 1	·	690 m	MPC · JPL
493858	2015 XB_{59}	—	October 19, 2006	Kitt Peak	Spacewatch	·	1.1 km	MPC · JPL
493859	2015 XA_{61}	—	March 13, 2012	Catalina	CSS	·	2.1 km	MPC · JPL
493860	2015 XX_{61}	—	September 23, 2011	Haleakala	Pan-STARRS 1	·	1.0 km	MPC · JPL
493861	2015 XB_{62}	—	February 14, 2010	Kitt Peak	Spacewatch	BAP	900 m	MPC · JPL
493862	2015 XE_{62}	—	January 25, 2012	Haleakala	Pan-STARRS 1	·	1.9 km	MPC · JPL
493863	2015 XS_{65}	—	March 24, 2012	Mount Lemmon	Mount Lemmon Survey	·	2.1 km	MPC · JPL
493864	2015 XY_{65}	—	October 22, 2011	Mount Lemmon	Mount Lemmon Survey	MAR	1.2 km	MPC · JPL
493865	2015 XO_{67}	—	August 30, 2011	Haleakala	Pan-STARRS 1	·	1.2 km	MPC · JPL
493866	2015 XL_{79}	—	November 20, 2008	Mount Lemmon	Mount Lemmon Survey	·	690 m	MPC · JPL
493867	2015 XD_{81}	—	February 1, 2012	Mount Lemmon	Mount Lemmon Survey	·	2.0 km	MPC · JPL
493868	2015 XQ_{82}	—	September 27, 2006	Kitt Peak	Spacewatch	MAR	790 m	MPC · JPL
493869	2015 XQ_{91}	—	November 30, 2011	Mount Lemmon	Mount Lemmon Survey	·	860 m	MPC · JPL
493870	2015 XW_{97}	—	December 31, 2007	Kitt Peak	Spacewatch	·	1.4 km	MPC · JPL
493871	2015 XA_{101}	—	March 14, 2007	Mount Lemmon	Mount Lemmon Survey	(2076)	690 m	MPC · JPL
493872	2015 XQ_{101}	—	June 28, 2014	Haleakala	Pan-STARRS 1	·	1.5 km	MPC · JPL
493873	2015 XP_{102}	—	April 16, 2012	Haleakala	Pan-STARRS 1	·	2.5 km	MPC · JPL
493874	2015 XF_{108}	—	September 14, 2007	Kitt Peak	Spacewatch	·	1.0 km	MPC · JPL
493875	2015 XM_{108}	—	July 28, 2014	Haleakala	Pan-STARRS 1	EOS	1.4 km	MPC · JPL
493876	2015 XO_{109}	—	December 25, 2005	Kitt Peak	Spacewatch	·	1.5 km	MPC · JPL
493877	2015 XW_{109}	—	February 7, 2008	Mount Lemmon	Mount Lemmon Survey	·	1.5 km	MPC · JPL
493878	2015 XR_{110}	—	December 1, 2005	Mount Lemmon	Mount Lemmon Survey	·	850 m	MPC · JPL
493879	2015 XV_{110}	—	November 8, 2007	Mount Lemmon	Mount Lemmon Survey	·	1.1 km	MPC · JPL
493880	2015 XW_{111}	—	April 8, 2008	Mount Lemmon	Mount Lemmon Survey	·	1.4 km	MPC · JPL
493881	2015 XK_{113}	—	September 26, 2011	Mount Lemmon	Mount Lemmon Survey	·	820 m	MPC · JPL
493882	2015 XE_{127}	—	May 8, 2013	Haleakala	Pan-STARRS 1	MAR	1.0 km	MPC · JPL
493883	2015 XW_{139}	—	January 31, 2009	Kitt Peak	Spacewatch	NYS	1.2 km	MPC · JPL
493884	2015 XY_{160}	—	August 22, 2014	Haleakala	Pan-STARRS 1	·	2.5 km	MPC · JPL
493885	2015 XC_{161}	—	December 3, 2010	Mount Lemmon	Mount Lemmon Survey	EOS	1.5 km	MPC · JPL
493886	2015 XC_{164}	—	October 26, 2011	Haleakala	Pan-STARRS 1	·	1.2 km	MPC · JPL
493887	2015 XV_{165}	—	September 18, 2003	Kitt Peak	Spacewatch	THB	2.6 km	MPC · JPL
493888	2015 XG_{166}	—	March 5, 2008	Mount Lemmon	Mount Lemmon Survey	·	1.5 km	MPC · JPL
493889	2015 XP_{167}	—	September 18, 2010	Mount Lemmon	Mount Lemmon Survey	·	2.0 km	MPC · JPL
493890	2015 XL_{170}	—	September 18, 2011	Mount Lemmon	Mount Lemmon Survey	MAS	620 m	MPC · JPL
493891	2015 XX_{193}	—	October 24, 2011	Kitt Peak	Spacewatch	·	1.1 km	MPC · JPL
493892	2015 XE_{196}	—	November 11, 2010	Mount Lemmon	Mount Lemmon Survey	·	1.5 km	MPC · JPL
493893	2015 XZ_{201}	—	April 11, 2013	Mount Lemmon	Mount Lemmon Survey	·	1.9 km	MPC · JPL
493894	2015 XY_{215}	—	August 22, 2014	Haleakala	Pan-STARRS 1	·	2.3 km	MPC · JPL
493895	2015 XK_{221}	—	January 14, 2011	Mount Lemmon	Mount Lemmon Survey	·	2.7 km	MPC · JPL
493896	2015 XS_{226}	—	January 20, 2009	Mount Lemmon	Mount Lemmon Survey	·	1.1 km	MPC · JPL
493897	2015 XZ_{230}	—	November 29, 2011	Kitt Peak	Spacewatch	·	1.6 km	MPC · JPL
493898	2015 XZ_{232}	—	November 2, 2010	Mount Lemmon	Mount Lemmon Survey	·	1.9 km	MPC · JPL
493899	2015 XT_{233}	—	January 10, 2008	Mount Lemmon	Mount Lemmon Survey	·	1.1 km	MPC · JPL
493900	2015 XX_{234}	—	April 16, 2013	Haleakala	Pan-STARRS 1	EUN	1.4 km	MPC · JPL

== 493901–494000 ==
back to top

Designation			Discovery			Properties		Ref
Permanent	Provisional	Named after	Date	Site	Discoverer(s)	Category	Diam.	Ref
493901	2015 XD_{235}	—	September 25, 2011	Haleakala	Pan-STARRS 1	V	630 m	MPC · JPL
493902	2015 XT_{262}	—	October 21, 2011	Haleakala	Pan-STARRS 1	·	1.4 km	MPC · JPL
493903	2015 XU_{266}	—	October 25, 2005	Mount Lemmon	Mount Lemmon Survey	KOR	1.2 km	MPC · JPL
493904	2015 XH_{280}	—	January 15, 2004	Kitt Peak	Spacewatch	·	980 m	MPC · JPL
493905	2015 XH_{283}	—	May 8, 2013	Haleakala	Pan-STARRS 1	·	1.1 km	MPC · JPL
493906	2015 XK_{287}	—	December 29, 2008	Mount Lemmon	Mount Lemmon Survey	·	920 m	MPC · JPL
493907	2015 XD_{289}	—	January 18, 2008	Mount Lemmon	Mount Lemmon Survey	·	1.0 km	MPC · JPL
493908	2015 XX_{309}	—	May 10, 2007	Kitt Peak	Spacewatch	EOS	2.2 km	MPC · JPL
493909	2015 XV_{310}	—	April 7, 2006	Kitt Peak	Spacewatch	·	830 m	MPC · JPL
493910	2015 XC_{311}	—	January 8, 2006	Mount Lemmon	Mount Lemmon Survey	·	2.4 km	MPC · JPL
493911	2015 XU_{320}	—	December 26, 2005	Kitt Peak	Spacewatch	·	1.6 km	MPC · JPL
493912	2015 XQ_{324}	—	October 25, 2011	Haleakala	Pan-STARRS 1	V	700 m	MPC · JPL
493913	2015 XZ_{325}	—	August 28, 2014	Haleakala	Pan-STARRS 1	EOS	1.7 km	MPC · JPL
493914	2015 XU_{327}	—	August 28, 2014	Haleakala	Pan-STARRS 1	·	2.2 km	MPC · JPL
493915	2015 XF_{328}	—	April 25, 2007	Mount Lemmon	Mount Lemmon Survey	·	2.9 km	MPC · JPL
493916	2015 XW_{328}	—	November 16, 2006	Mount Lemmon	Mount Lemmon Survey	·	1.9 km	MPC · JPL
493917	2015 XX_{328}	—	October 2, 2005	Mount Lemmon	Mount Lemmon Survey	AST	1.4 km	MPC · JPL
493918	2015 XL_{329}	—	August 18, 2014	Haleakala	Pan-STARRS 1	·	1.8 km	MPC · JPL
493919	2015 XX_{330}	—	November 20, 2006	Kitt Peak	Spacewatch	·	1.8 km	MPC · JPL
493920	2015 XX_{334}	—	August 22, 2014	Haleakala	Pan-STARRS 1	·	2.1 km	MPC · JPL
493921	2015 XK_{335}	—	October 15, 2009	Kitt Peak	Spacewatch	·	2.9 km	MPC · JPL
493922	2015 XL_{335}	—	September 30, 2005	Mount Lemmon	Mount Lemmon Survey	AGN	1.3 km	MPC · JPL
493923	2015 XS_{335}	—	November 18, 2006	Kitt Peak	Spacewatch	NEM	1.8 km	MPC · JPL
493924	2015 XC_{338}	—	August 4, 2014	Haleakala	Pan-STARRS 1	·	1.3 km	MPC · JPL
493925	2015 XQ_{340}	—	November 20, 2009	Mount Lemmon	Mount Lemmon Survey	·	2.5 km	MPC · JPL
493926	2015 XR_{345}	—	June 10, 2007	Kitt Peak	Spacewatch	·	2.8 km	MPC · JPL
493927	2015 XS_{364}	—	January 26, 2011	Kitt Peak	Spacewatch	HYG	2.4 km	MPC · JPL
493928	2015 XP_{366}	—	October 2, 2006	Mount Lemmon	Mount Lemmon Survey	·	1.3 km	MPC · JPL
493929	2015 XS_{366}	—	January 28, 2000	Kitt Peak	Spacewatch	·	2.8 km	MPC · JPL
493930	2015 XQ_{368}	—	February 7, 2008	Mount Lemmon	Mount Lemmon Survey	·	990 m	MPC · JPL
493931	2015 XU_{368}	—	December 19, 2003	Kitt Peak	Spacewatch	·	940 m	MPC · JPL
493932	2015 XJ_{375}	—	April 27, 2009	Kitt Peak	Spacewatch	·	1.3 km	MPC · JPL
493933	2015 XS_{381}	—	August 3, 2014	Haleakala	Pan-STARRS 1	·	1.6 km	MPC · JPL
493934	2015 YJ_{4}	—	October 10, 2010	Mount Lemmon	Mount Lemmon Survey	·	2.0 km	MPC · JPL
493935	2015 YS_{8}	—	October 26, 2005	Kitt Peak	Spacewatch	·	2.3 km	MPC · JPL
493936	2015 YP_{9}	—	November 30, 1999	Kitt Peak	Spacewatch	·	1.5 km	MPC · JPL
493937	2016 AG	—	February 23, 2011	Catalina	CSS	·	3.2 km	MPC · JPL
493938	2016 AH_{1}	—	November 8, 2009	Kitt Peak	Spacewatch	EOS	1.9 km	MPC · JPL
493939	2016 AZ_{3}	—	March 13, 2012	Mount Lemmon	Mount Lemmon Survey	KOR	1.4 km	MPC · JPL
493940	2016 AT_{6}	—	December 3, 2004	Kitt Peak	Spacewatch	THM	2.0 km	MPC · JPL
493941	2016 AD_{9}	—	May 30, 2008	Mount Lemmon	Mount Lemmon Survey	·	1.6 km	MPC · JPL
493942	2016 AR_{10}	—	March 16, 2007	Catalina	CSS	·	2.9 km	MPC · JPL
493943	2016 AB_{11}	—	May 21, 2006	Mount Lemmon	Mount Lemmon Survey	·	3.5 km	MPC · JPL
493944	2016 AR_{15}	—	December 5, 2010	Mount Lemmon	Mount Lemmon Survey	EOS	2.3 km	MPC · JPL
493945	2016 AK_{22}	—	February 5, 2011	Haleakala	Pan-STARRS 1	·	2.9 km	MPC · JPL
493946	2016 AL_{22}	—	December 17, 2003	Kitt Peak	Spacewatch	·	1.1 km	MPC · JPL
493947	2016 AN_{22}	—	February 28, 2012	Haleakala	Pan-STARRS 1	KOR	1.2 km	MPC · JPL
493948	2016 AH_{24}	—	September 3, 2008	Kitt Peak	Spacewatch	·	2.5 km	MPC · JPL
493949	2016 AP_{27}	—	June 11, 2004	Kitt Peak	Spacewatch	·	2.2 km	MPC · JPL
493950	2016 AW_{27}	—	November 8, 2009	Mount Lemmon	Mount Lemmon Survey	·	2.9 km	MPC · JPL
493951	2016 AC_{33}	—	April 10, 2003	Kitt Peak	Spacewatch	·	2.2 km	MPC · JPL
493952	2016 AG_{33}	—	April 14, 2008	Mount Lemmon	Mount Lemmon Survey	·	2.1 km	MPC · JPL
493953	2016 AU_{43}	—	March 25, 2011	Haleakala	Pan-STARRS 1	·	2.9 km	MPC · JPL
493954	2016 AP_{44}	—	October 14, 2009	Mount Lemmon	Mount Lemmon Survey	HYG	3.5 km	MPC · JPL
493955	2016 AF_{45}	—	September 30, 2005	Mount Lemmon	Mount Lemmon Survey	KOR	1.4 km	MPC · JPL
493956	2016 AL_{46}	—	May 21, 2006	Kitt Peak	Spacewatch	·	3.9 km	MPC · JPL
493957	2016 AS_{47}	—	January 6, 2006	Mount Lemmon	Mount Lemmon Survey	KOR	1.5 km	MPC · JPL
493958	2016 AW_{50}	—	December 7, 2005	Kitt Peak	Spacewatch	KOR	1.3 km	MPC · JPL
493959	2016 AG_{51}	—	May 14, 2012	Mount Lemmon	Mount Lemmon Survey	·	2.7 km	MPC · JPL
493960	2016 AJ_{52}	—	March 27, 2003	Kitt Peak	Spacewatch	HOF	3.6 km	MPC · JPL
493961	2016 AJ_{53}	—	February 7, 2010	WISE	WISE	·	2.8 km	MPC · JPL
493962	2016 AU_{55}	—	February 8, 2011	Mount Lemmon	Mount Lemmon Survey	·	2.5 km	MPC · JPL
493963	2016 AA_{56}	—	July 27, 2009	Kitt Peak	Spacewatch	·	2.1 km	MPC · JPL
493964	2016 AD_{58}	—	November 18, 2007	Mount Lemmon	Mount Lemmon Survey	·	1.2 km	MPC · JPL
493965	2016 AY_{58}	—	May 18, 2012	Haleakala	Pan-STARRS 1	·	3.0 km	MPC · JPL
493966	2016 AX_{60}	—	June 20, 2013	Haleakala	Pan-STARRS 1	·	3.6 km	MPC · JPL
493967	2016 AD_{64}	—	November 22, 2009	Kitt Peak	Spacewatch	·	3.6 km	MPC · JPL
493968	2016 AR_{66}	—	October 22, 2006	Kitt Peak	Spacewatch	·	1.4 km	MPC · JPL
493969	2016 AT_{66}	—	February 12, 2010	WISE	WISE	·	2.5 km	MPC · JPL
493970	2016 AP_{67}	—	February 5, 2011	Catalina	CSS	·	2.5 km	MPC · JPL
493971	2016 AM_{68}	—	November 24, 2009	Kitt Peak	Spacewatch	·	3.4 km	MPC · JPL
493972	2016 AP_{68}	—	October 9, 1999	Socorro	LINEAR	·	1.6 km	MPC · JPL
493973	2016 AP_{71}	—	December 14, 2004	Catalina	CSS	EOS	2.4 km	MPC · JPL
493974	2016 AG_{73}	—	October 22, 2008	Kitt Peak	Spacewatch	·	3.6 km	MPC · JPL
493975	2016 AN_{73}	—	December 10, 2009	Mount Lemmon	Mount Lemmon Survey	·	3.1 km	MPC · JPL
493976	2016 AU_{74}	—	March 27, 2011	Kitt Peak	Spacewatch	·	2.7 km	MPC · JPL
493977	2016 AE_{76}	—	February 11, 1994	Kitt Peak	Spacewatch	(43176)	2.4 km	MPC · JPL
493978	2016 AY_{78}	—	March 31, 2012	Mount Lemmon	Mount Lemmon Survey	·	3.7 km	MPC · JPL
493979	2016 AV_{80}	—	August 20, 2014	Haleakala	Pan-STARRS 1	·	2.4 km	MPC · JPL
493980	2016 AM_{81}	—	February 19, 2010	WISE	WISE	·	6.0 km	MPC · JPL
493981	2016 AS_{81}	—	February 28, 2012	Haleakala	Pan-STARRS 1	HOF	2.5 km	MPC · JPL
493982	2016 AW_{88}	—	December 15, 2006	Kitt Peak	Spacewatch	·	1.8 km	MPC · JPL
493983	2016 AV_{90}	—	September 11, 2010	Mount Lemmon	Mount Lemmon Survey	·	1.9 km	MPC · JPL
493984	2016 AB_{97}	—	January 8, 2011	Mount Lemmon	Mount Lemmon Survey	VER	2.9 km	MPC · JPL
493985	2016 AJ_{98}	—	October 3, 2014	Mount Lemmon	Mount Lemmon Survey	·	1.8 km	MPC · JPL
493986	2016 AZ_{98}	—	September 24, 2009	Mount Lemmon	Mount Lemmon Survey	AGN	1.2 km	MPC · JPL
493987	2016 AT_{101}	—	July 13, 2013	Haleakala	Pan-STARRS 1	·	2.1 km	MPC · JPL
493988	2016 AX_{101}	—	October 23, 2003	Kitt Peak	Spacewatch	·	2.6 km	MPC · JPL
493989	2016 AX_{102}	—	February 23, 2007	Catalina	CSS	·	2.9 km	MPC · JPL
493990	2016 AF_{103}	—	July 14, 2013	Haleakala	Pan-STARRS 1	EOS	1.7 km	MPC · JPL
493991	2016 AO_{103}	—	July 13, 2013	Haleakala	Pan-STARRS 1	·	2.0 km	MPC · JPL
493992	2016 AV_{103}	—	November 23, 2014	Haleakala	Pan-STARRS 1	·	2.7 km	MPC · JPL
493993	2016 AA_{105}	—	January 25, 2007	Kitt Peak	Spacewatch	·	2.0 km	MPC · JPL
493994	2016 AX_{105}	—	August 6, 2014	Haleakala	Pan-STARRS 1	slow	1.4 km	MPC · JPL
493995	2016 AC_{106}	—	March 9, 2011	Mount Lemmon	Mount Lemmon Survey	HYG	3.0 km	MPC · JPL
493996	2016 AF_{106}	—	June 22, 2007	Kitt Peak	Spacewatch	·	4.0 km	MPC · JPL
493997	2016 AO_{106}	—	February 13, 2011	Mount Lemmon	Mount Lemmon Survey	·	2.1 km	MPC · JPL
493998	2016 AU_{106}	—	May 19, 2012	Mount Lemmon	Mount Lemmon Survey	·	2.1 km	MPC · JPL
493999	2016 AS_{110}	—	January 16, 2005	Kitt Peak	Spacewatch	·	3.2 km	MPC · JPL
494000	2016 AT_{110}	—	April 21, 2012	Mount Lemmon	Mount Lemmon Survey	·	2.0 km	MPC · JPL

back to top
