= Lucy (spacecraft) =

NASA mission to fly by eight asteroids

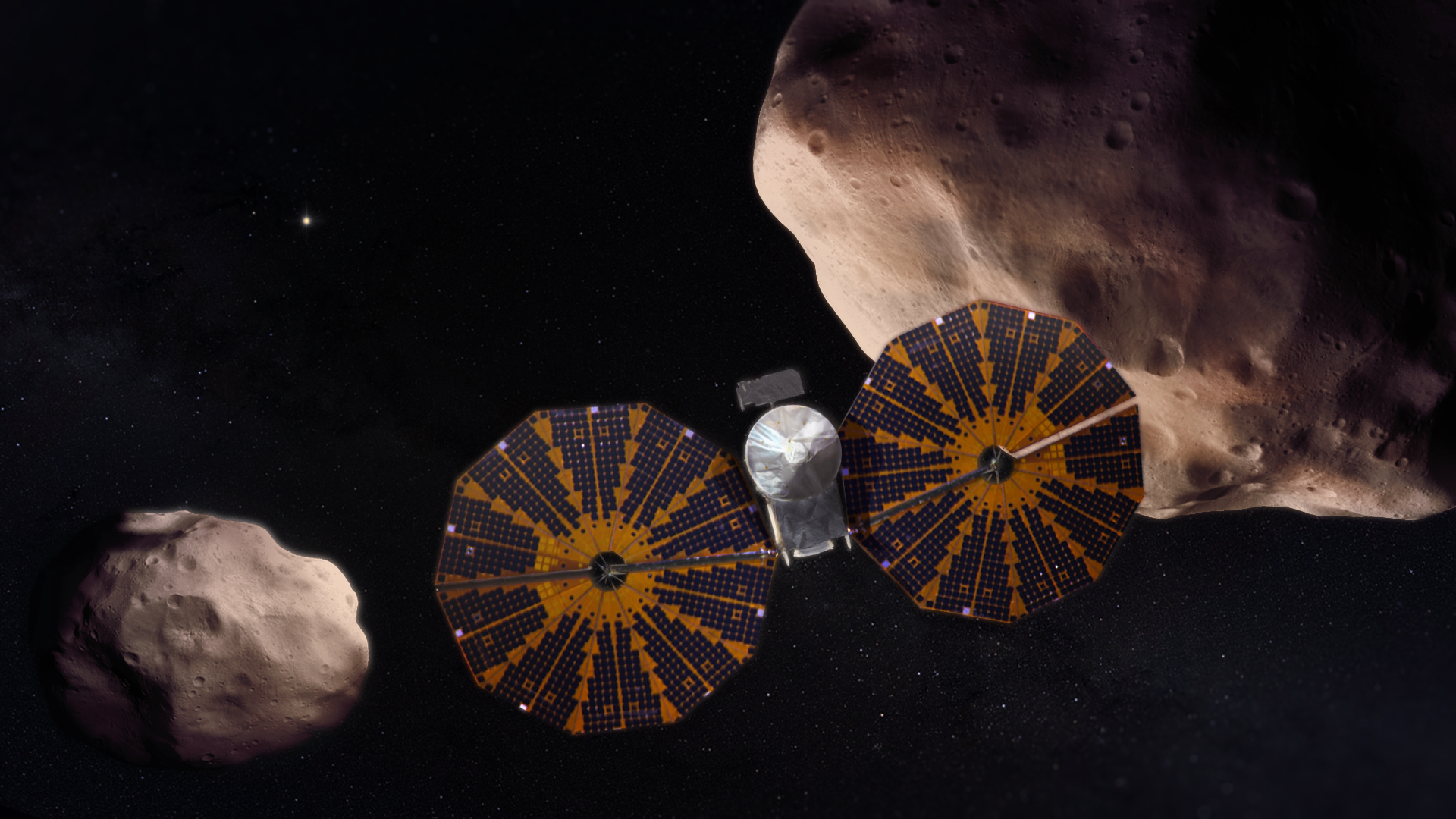
- Artist's conception of Lucy spacecraft flying past the Trojan asteroid 617 Patroclus and its binary companion Menoetius
- Names: Discovery Mission 13
- Mission type: Multiple-flyby of asteroids
- Operator: NASA Goddard · SwRI
- COSPAR ID: 2021-093A
- SATCAT no.: 49328
- Website: lucy.swri.edu
- Mission duration: 12 years (planned); 5 years, 1 month and 5 days (in progress)

Spacecraft properties
- Manufacturer: Lockheed Martin
- Launch mass: 1,550 kg (3,420 lb)
- Dry mass: 821 kg (1,810 lb)
- Dimensions: 13 m (43 ft) in long Each solar panel: 7.3 m (24 ft) in diameter
- Power: 504 watts (furthest encounter)

Start of mission
- Launch date: 16 October 2021, 09:34 UTC
- Rocket: Atlas V 401 (AV-096)
- Launch site: Cape Canaveral SLC-41
- Contractor: United Launch Alliance

Instruments
- High-resolution visible imager (L'LORRI); Optical and near-infrared imaging spectrometer (L'Ralph); Thermal infrared spectrometer (L'TES)
- Lucy mission patch Discovery Program

Lucy is a NASA space probe on a twelve-year journey to eight different asteroids. It is slated to visit two main belt asteroids as well as six Jupiter trojans – asteroids that share Jupiter's orbit around the Sun, orbiting either ahead of or behind the planet. All target encounters will be flyby encounters.

The Lucy spacecraft is the centerpiece of a US$981 million mission. On 4 January 2017, Lucy was chosen, along with the Psyche mission, as NASA's Discovery Program missions 13 and 14 respectively. It was launched on 16 October 2021. In November 2023 and in April 2025 it flew by and photographed asteroids Dinkinesh and Donaldjohanson, respectively. Lucy will reach its first main target, the Jupiter Trojan asteroid Eurybates, in August 2027.

The mission is named after the Lucy hominin fossils, because study of the trojans could reveal the "fossils of planet formation": materials that clumped together in the early history of the Solar System to form planets and other bodies. The hominid itself was named after the 1967 Beatles song "Lucy in the Sky with Diamonds". The spacecraft carries a disc made of lab-grown diamonds for its L'TES instrument.

== Overview ==
Lucy was launched from Cape Canaveral SLC-41 on 16 October 2021, at 09:34 UTC on the 401 variant of a United Launch Alliance Atlas V launch vehicle. It gained one gravity assist from Earth a year later on 16 October 2022, and after making a flyby of the asteroid 152830 Dinkinesh in 2023, gained another gravity assist from Earth in 2024. In 2025, it flew by the inner main-belt asteroid 52246 Donaldjohanson, which was named after the discoverer of the Lucy hominin fossil. In 2027, it will arrive at the L_{4} Trojan cloud (the Greek camp of asteroids that orbits about 60° ahead of Jupiter), where it will fly by four Trojans, 3548 Eurybates (with its satellite), 15094 Polymele, 11351 Leucus, and 21900 Orus. After these flybys, Lucy will return to Earth in 2031 for another gravity assist toward the L_{5} Trojan cloud (the Trojan camp which trails about 60° behind Jupiter), where it will visit the binary Trojan 617 Patroclus with its satellite Menoetius in 2033. The mission may end with the Patroclus–Menoetius flyby, but at that point Lucy will be in a stable, 6-year orbit between the L4 and L5 clouds, and a mission extension will be possible.

Three instruments comprise the payload: a high-resolution visible imager, an optical and near-infrared imaging spectrometer, and a thermal infrared spectrometer. Harold F. Levison of the Southwest Research Institute in Boulder, Colorado is the principal investigator, with Simone Marchi of Southwest Research Institute as the mission's deputy principal investigator. NASA's Goddard Space Flight Center executes the mission under the direction of the Planetary Missions Program Office at Marshall Space Flight Center for the Planetary Science Division-Science Mission Directorate at NASA HQ.

Exploration of Jupiter Trojans is one of the high-priority goals outlined in the Planetary Science Decadal Survey. Jupiter Trojans have been observed by ground-based telescopes and the Wide-field Infrared Survey Explorer to be "dark with... surfaces that reflect little sunlight". Jupiter is 5.2 AU (780×10^{6} km; 480×10^{6} mi) from the Sun, or about five times the Earth–Sun distance. The Jupiter Trojans are at a similar distance but can be somewhat farther or closer to the Sun depending on where they are in their orbits. There may be as many Trojans as there are Main-belt asteroids.

== Development ==
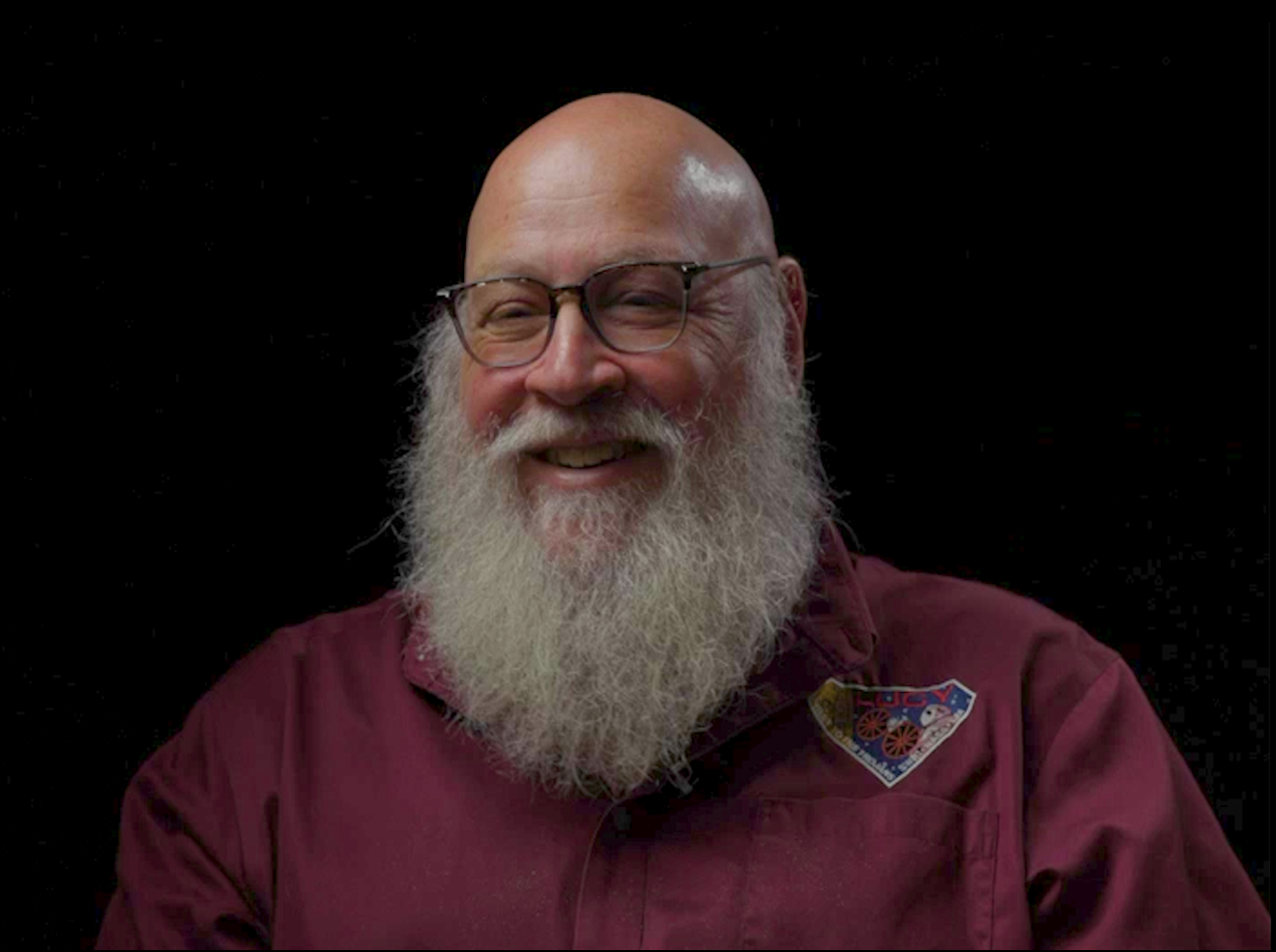
Harold F. Levison, principal investigator of the Lucy mission.

NASA selected Lucy through the Discovery Program Announcement of Opportunity (AO) released on 5 November 2014. Lucy was submitted as part of a call for proposals for the next mission(s) for Discovery Program that closed in February 2015. Proposals had to be ready to launch by the end of 2021. Twenty-eight proposals were received in all.

On 30 September 2015, Lucy was selected as one of five finalist missions, each of which received US$3 million to produce more in-depth concept design studies and analyses. Its fellow finalists were DAVINCI, NEOCam, Psyche and VERITAS. On 4 January 2017, Lucy and Psyche were selected for development and launch.

On 31 January 2019, NASA announced that Lucy would launch in October 2021 on an Atlas V 401 launch vehicle from Cape Canaveral, Florida. The total cost for the launch was estimated to be US$148.3 million. On 11 February 2019, SpaceX protested the contract award, claiming that it could launch Lucy into the same orbit at a "significantly cheaper cost". On 4 April 2019, SpaceX withdrew the protest.

On 28 August 2020, NASA announced that Lucy had passed its Key Decision Point-D (KDP-D) with a "green light" to assemble and test the spacecraft and its instruments. The spacecraft instruments arrived beginning with L'LORRI on 26 October 2020. On 30 July 2021, the spacecraft was transported on a C-17 transport aircraft to Florida for launch preparations, and Lucy was encapsulated into the rocket fairing on 30 September 2021.

Lucy was launched on 16 October 2021 at 09:34 UTC at the opening of its 23-day launch window.

== Scientific instruments ==
In order to reduce costs and improve reliability, many of Lucy's scientific instruments are derived from previous spacecraft with similar scientific missions, most notably New Horizons and OSIRIS-REx.

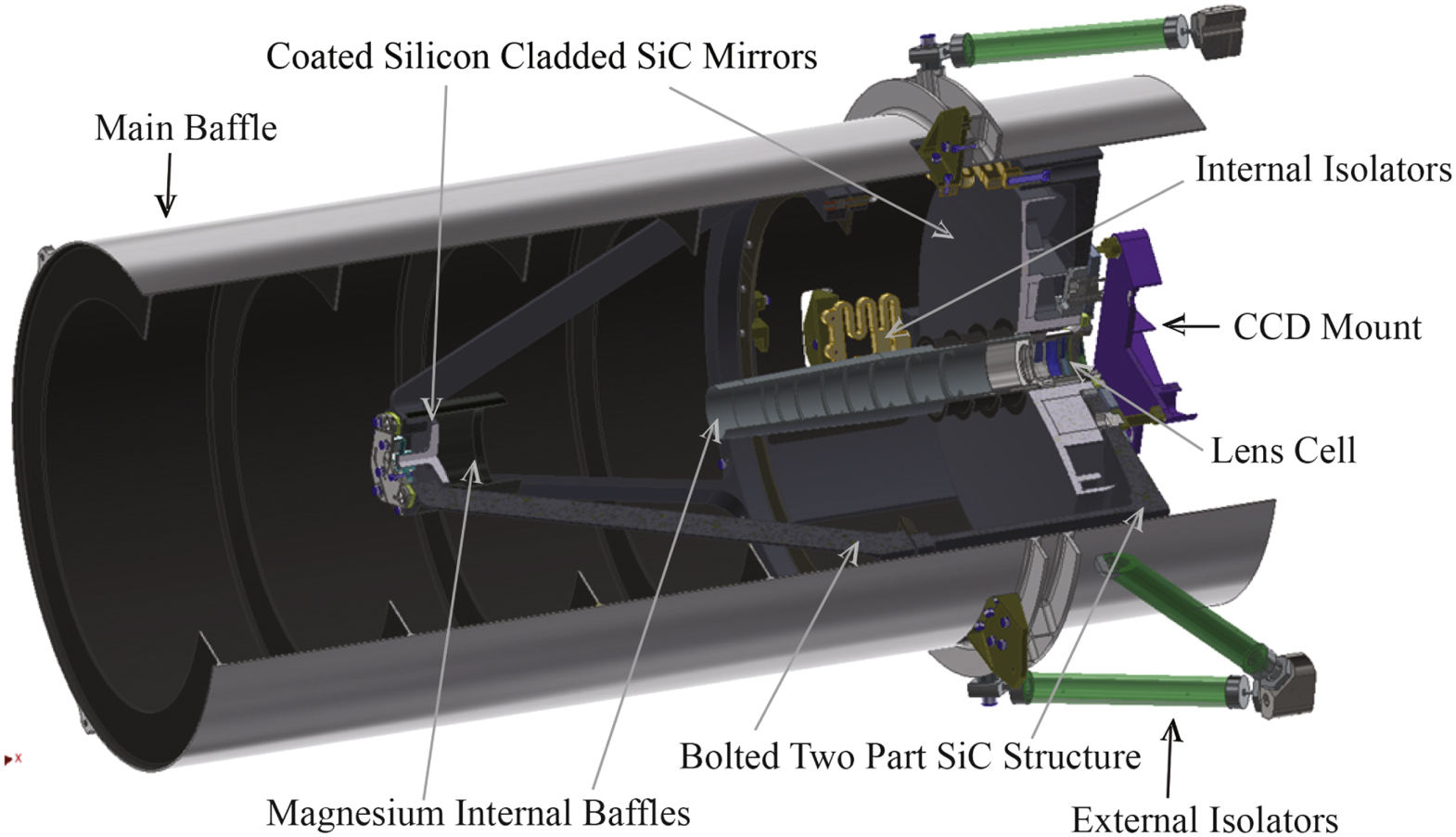
CAD drawing of L'LORRI

=== L'LORRI ===
The Lucy LOng Range Reconnaissance Imager (L'LORRI) is a high-resolution visible camera built at the Johns Hopkins University Applied Physics Laboratory. Derived from the LORRI instrument on New Horizons, It will provide the most detailed images of the surface of the Trojans. L'LORRI uses the same detector and has the same optical design as New Horizons LORRI. The primary mirror has a diameter of 20.8 cm, the system has a focal length of 262 cm, and the detector is a 1024 × 1024 thinned back-illuminated frame transfer CCD from Teledyne e2v. Each pixel subtends 5 μrad (1.03 arcseconds) and will have a point-spread function with a FWHM of less than 15 μrad (<3.09 arcseconds). Differences from the heritage instrument worth noting are the addition of redundant electronics, memory to store LORRI data, and the difference in the instrument accommodation. On New Horizons, the LORRI instrument is inside of the spacecraft, but on Lucy L'LORRI is mounted on an Instrument Pointing Platform (IPP).

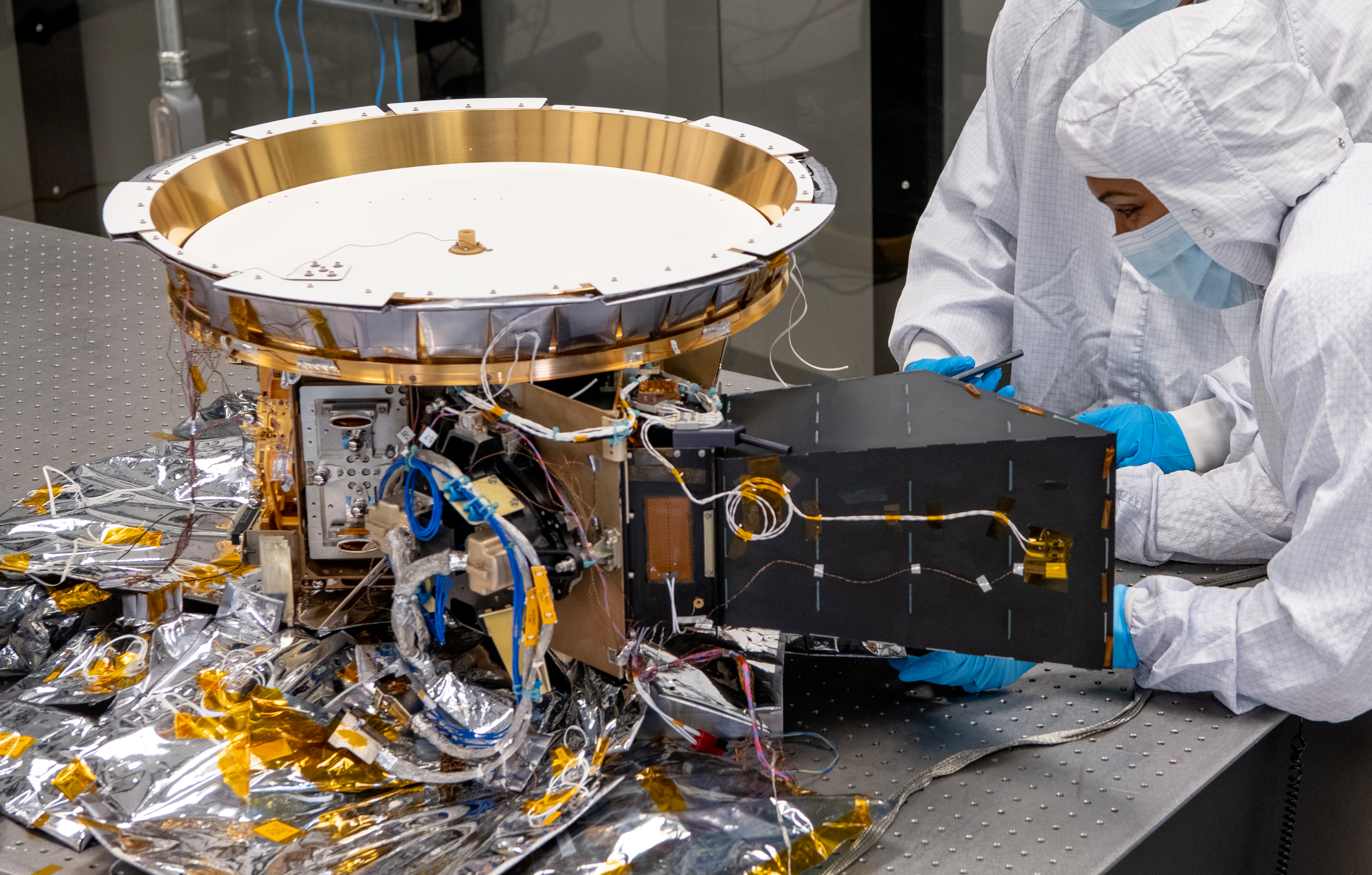
L'Ralph

=== L'Ralph ===
Lucy Ralph (L'Ralph) consists of two instruments: the Multispectral Visible Imaging Camera (MVIC), a multispectral imager that can produce both true-color and false-color images using wavelengths between 380 and 920 nanometers, and the Linear Etalon Imaging Spectral Array (LEISA), an infrared spectroscope designed to map rocks and ice on the surface of the target asteroids using wavelengths between 1 and 3.6 micrometers. L'Ralph is based on the Ralph instrument on New Horizons and was built at Goddard Space Flight Center. It will be used to measure silicates, ices, and organics at the surface. The L'Ralph instrument has a three-mirror anastigmat design f/6 with a 75 mm aperture. The telescope structure is composed from one aluminum block to provide an athermal imaging system. A beamsplitter transmits the longer wavelength light to LEISA and reflects light short of ~960 nm to MVIC. The instrument is passively cooled with a 20-inch (510 mm) diameter radiator that cools the LEISA detector to ~100 K. A new component of the L'Ralph instrument compared with its predecessors is a scan mirror assembly. The scan mirror is used to sweep the target across the Ralph focal planes to build up either visible images or infrared spectra.

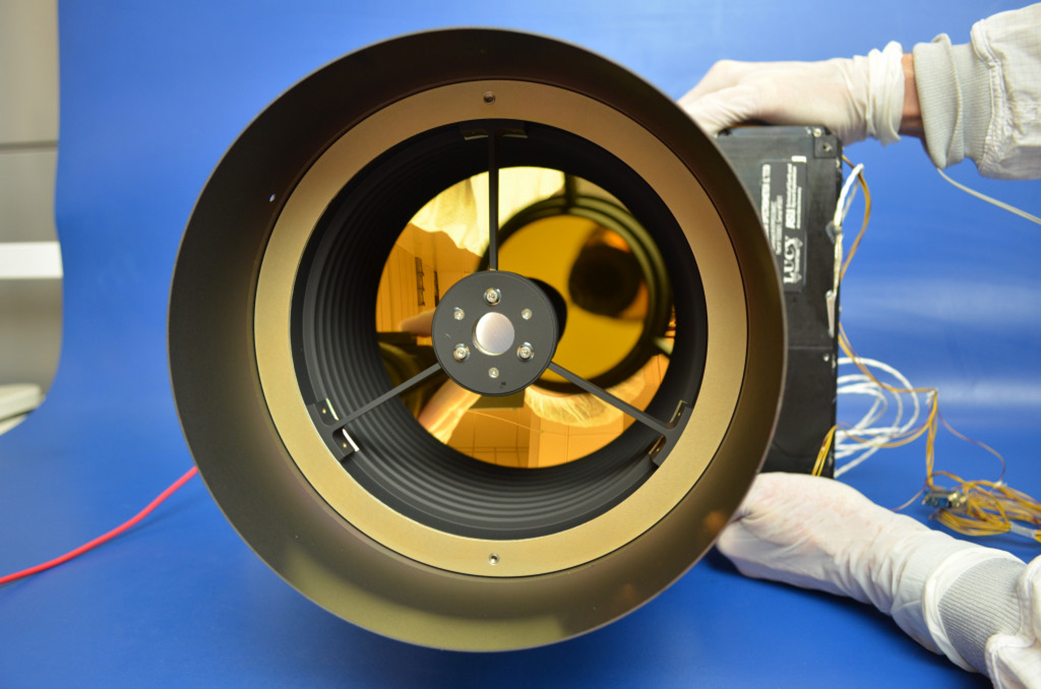
L'TES

=== L'TES ===
The Lucy Thermal Emission Spectrometer (L'TES) is a thermal infrared spectrometer derived from the OTES instrument on OSIRIS-REx. L'TES was built at Arizona State University and uses wavelengths between 6 and 75 micrometers. It will reveal the thermal characteristics of the observed Trojans, which will also inform the composition and structure of the material on the surface of the asteroids. OTES was used to derive the surface composition and thermal inertia of the asteroid Bennu. However, because the Trojan asteroids at 5 AU are much colder than Bennu, the Lucy mission does not plan to use L'TES to derive surface composition. Instead, L'TES will be used primarily to infer regolith properties. L'TES has the same optical–mechanical design as OTES, including a 15.2 cm diameter Cassegrain telescope, a Michelson interferometer with chemical vapor deposited diamond beamsplitter, and an uncooled, deuterated L-alanine doped triglycine sulfate (DLATGS) pyroelectric detector. L'TES has only small differences from the heritage instrument including removing a potential stray light path by modifying the telescope baffle and primary mirror inner diameter and improvements to the metrology laser system. An internal calibration cone blackbody target provides radiometric calibration. The L'TES instrument collects data from 6–75 μm and has a noise equivalent spectral radiance (NESR) of 2.310–8 W cm^{−2} sr^{−1} cm^{−1} between 300 cm^{−1} (7.4 μm) and 1350 cm^{−1} (33 μm). For surfaces with temperatures greater than 75 K, L'TES will determine the temperature with an accuracy of 2 K. The 50% encircled energy of the instrument subtends 6.5 mrad. L'TES has one mode of taking data. It continuously collects interferograms (every 0.5, 1.0, or 2.0 s) and transfers them to the spacecraft for storage before downlink. The instrument will start collecting data one day before closest approach, which is before the target fills the instrument's FOV. The data collection will continue until one day after closest approach. The L'TES instrument will measure the radiance of each Trojan asteroid at four locations at different local times of day with the additional requirement that one observation measures a location within 30° of the subsolar point and another measures the unilluminated surface.

=== T2Cam ===
The Terminal Tracking Cameras (T2Cam or TTCam) are a pair of wide-angle monochromatic cameras designed to take frequent, wide-field images of the asteroids in order to better constrain their shapes.

=== Radio Science Investigation ===
The Radio Science Investigation will use Lucy's high-gain antenna to attempt to measure the slight Doppler shift created when the spacecraft passes through a gravitational field. This is an indirect way of measuring the mass of an object, possibly allowing highly accurate constraints on the masses and bulk densities of the target asteroids.

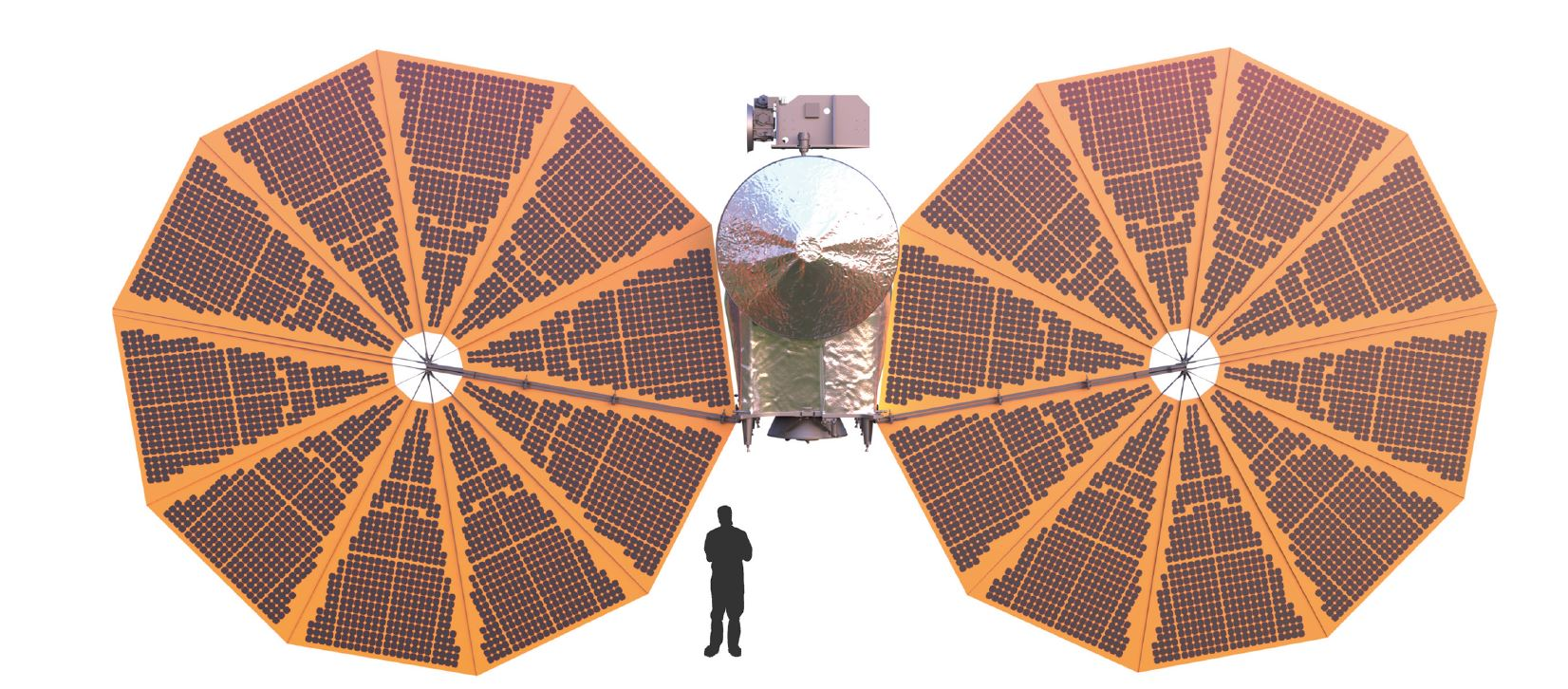
Illustration of the deployed spacecraft

Lucy spacecraft solar arrays deploying and main engine burn

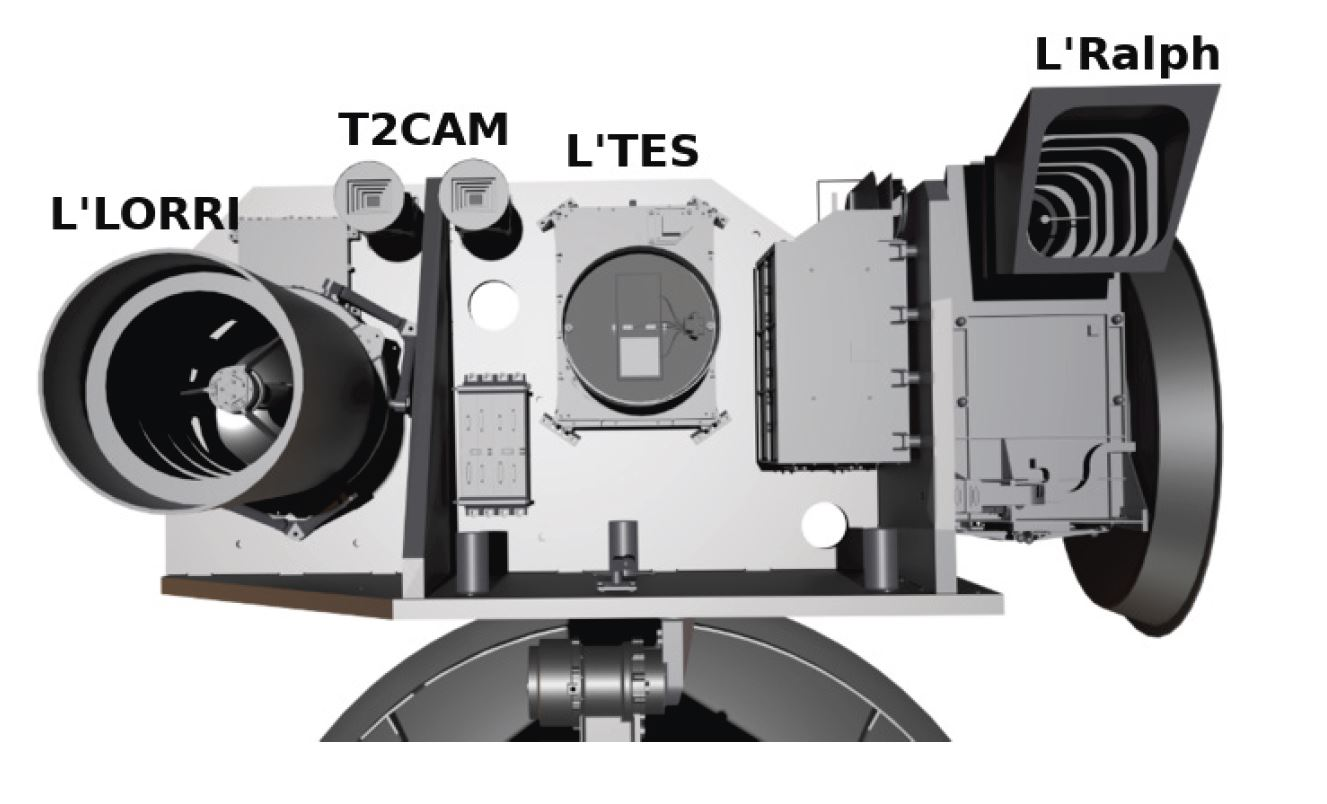
Instruments onboard

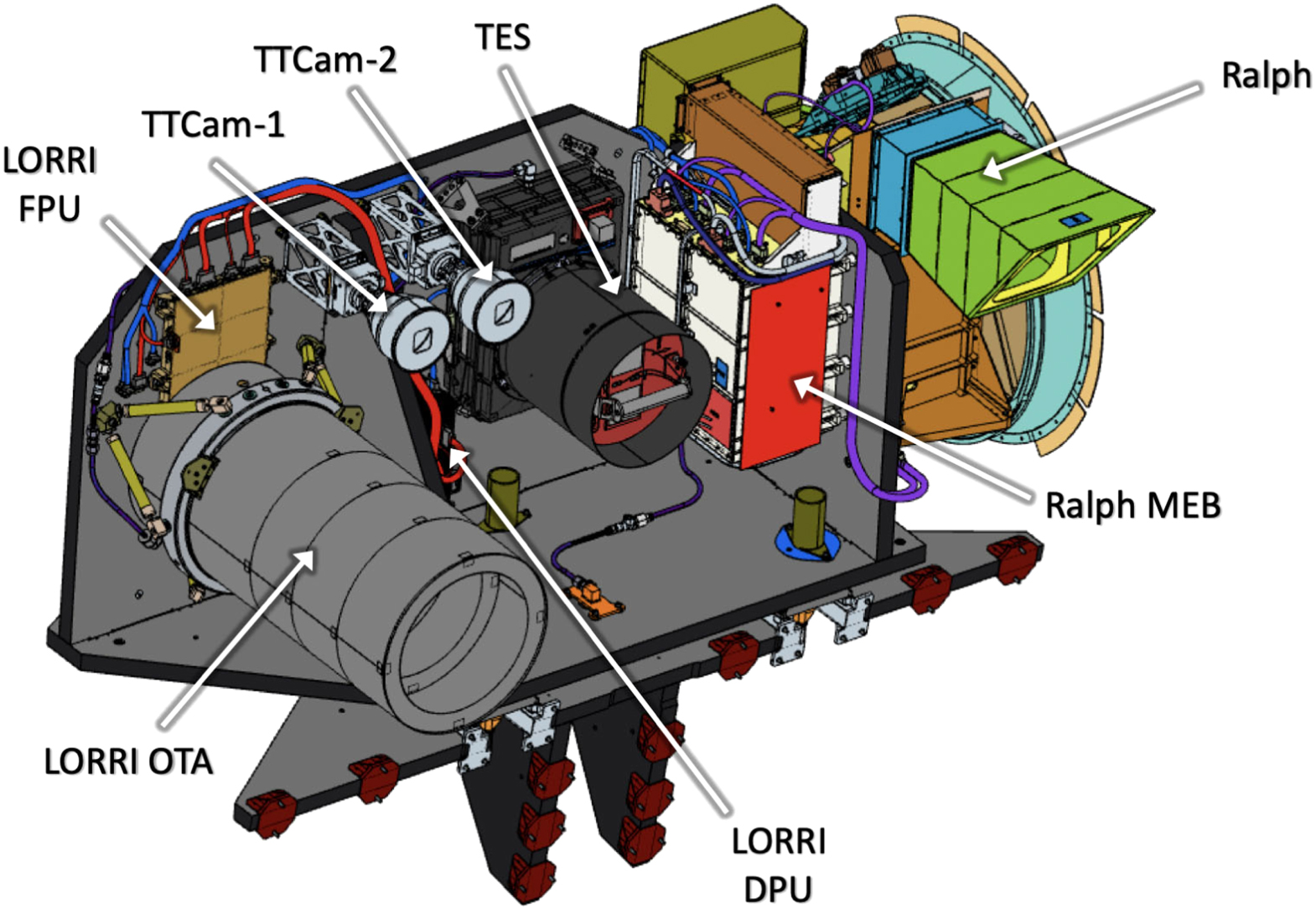
The Instrument Pointing Platform (IPP)

== Golden plaque ==
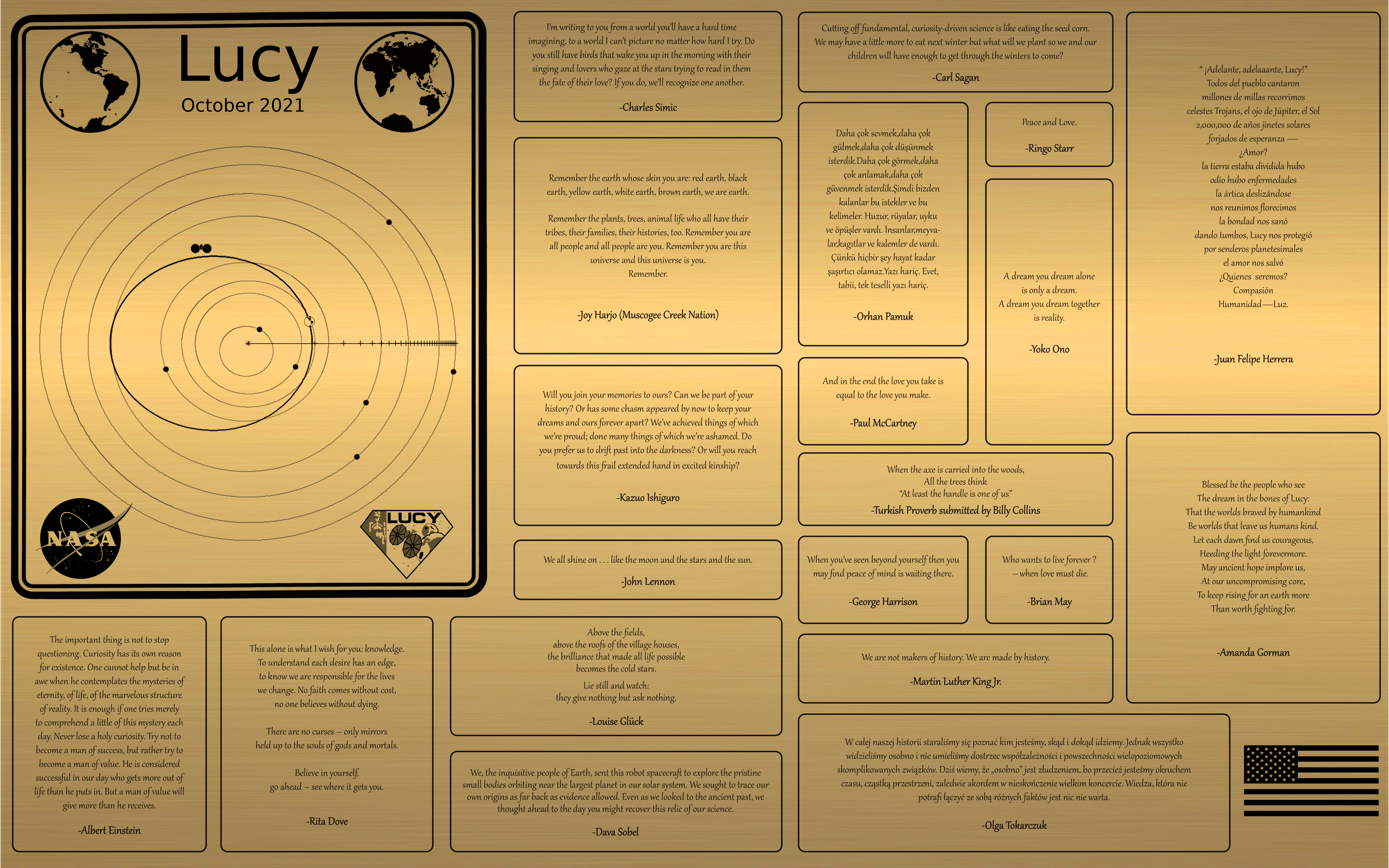
A plaque on the Lucy mission featuring 20 messages from people on Earth

On board the spacecraft is a golden plaque that contains its launch date, the positions of the planets at the launch date, the continents of Earth at the time of launch, its nominal trajectory, and twenty speeches, poems, and song lyrics from people such as Martin Luther King Jr., Carl Sagan, The Beatles, and more. Because the spacecraft will not leave the Solar System or be intentionally crashed into a planetary body, there is a chance that future generations of humanity will be able to recover it.

== Trajectory and targets ==
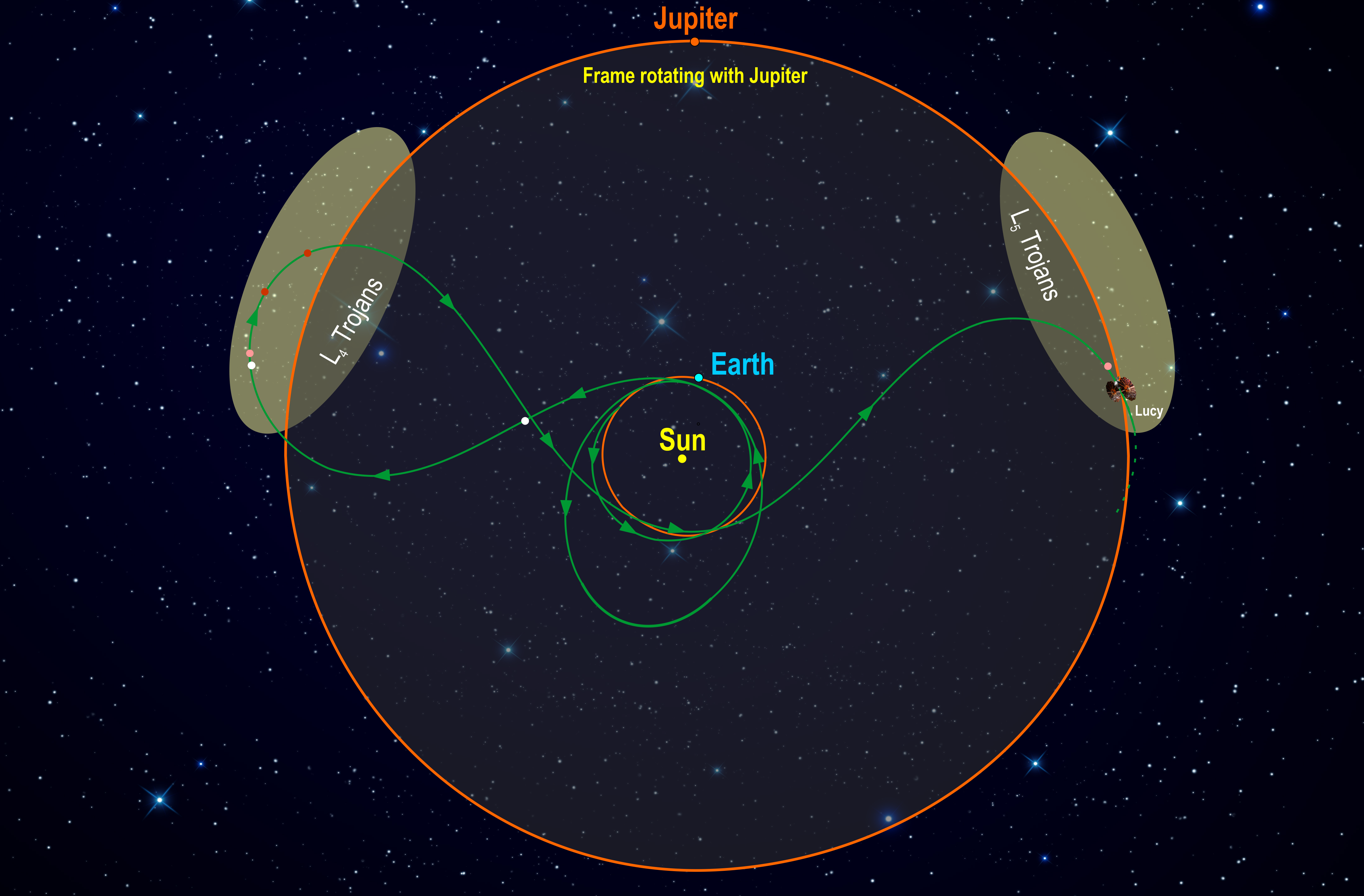
Lucy will alternate visiting Jupiter's Greek (L_{4}) and Trojan camps (L_{5}) every six years.

Seven of the Lucy mission's targets: the binary asteroid Patroclus/Menoetius, Eurybates, Orus, Leucus, Polymele, and the main belt asteroid Donaldjohanson.

Lucy's trajectory was designed to visit as many asteroids, in as great a variety, as the maneuvering fuel (?) allows. The main elements of the trajectory are an Earth flyby, observation of asteroid Dinkintesh, a large deep space maneuver, another Earth flyby, then past asteroid Donaldjohnson on the way to 4 asteroids (2 double) at Jupiter's L_{4}. Then the orbit falls back to Earth for another flyby, then on to Jupiter's L_{5}. The first flyby was not strictly needed – the same rocket could put Lucy onto the post-encounter trajectory a year later, and result in exactly the same tour. But it provided schedule margin (which was not needed) and a practice flyby of Earth. However, the deep space maneuvers, and the resulting second Earth flyby, were required to add the additional velocity needed to reach Jupiter's orbit. So far, as of May 2025, the first two Earth flybys, the first two asteroid encounters, and the deep space maneuver have all completed as scheduled.

The specific objects that are targeted for flyby observation passes performed by the spacecraft include:

Encounter date	Target	Group	Diameter	Altitude	Classification	Comment
16 October 2022	Earth		12742 km	300 km		Gravity assist Lucy's (?) Centaur booster was detected by asteroid surveys and mistakenly designated 2022 UQ1.
1 November 2023	152830 Dinkinesh	Inner main belt	Dinkinesh: 0.7 km (Selam satellite: 0.2 km)	425 km	Binary S-type asteroid	Selected for visitation in January 2023.
13 December 2024	Earth		12742 km	350 km		Gravity assist
20 April 2025	52246 Donaldjohanson	Inner main belt	4 km	960 km	C-type asteroid	Member of ~130 Myr old Erigone collisional family
12 August 2027	3548 Eurybates	Greek camp at L_{4}	Eurybates: 64 km (Queta satellite: 1 km)	720 km	Binary C-type asteroid	Largest member of the only confirmed disruptive collisional family in the Trojans.
15 September 2027	15094 Polymele	Greek camp at L_{4}	Polymele: 21 km (Satellite: 5 km)	415 km	Binary P-type asteroid	May be a collisional fragment of a larger P-type asteroid. Its red color suggests surface is rich in organic tholin compounds.
18 April 2028	11351 Leucus	Greek camp at L_{4}	34 km	1000 km	D-type asteroid	Slow rotator taking 466 hours per rotation.
11 November 2028	21900 Orus	Greek camp at L_{4}	51 km	1000 km	D-type or C-type asteroid according to the Lucy mission team and by Pan-STARRS photometric survey, respectively.	Possible binary
26 December 2030	Earth		12742 km	660 km		Gravity assist. First spacecraft to return to Earth from past Jupiter's orbit.
2 March 2033	617 Patroclus–Menoetius	Trojan camp at L_{5}	Patroclus: 113 km Menoetius: 104 km	1000 km	Binary D-type asteroids	The pair orbit at a separation of 680 km

== Propulsion ==
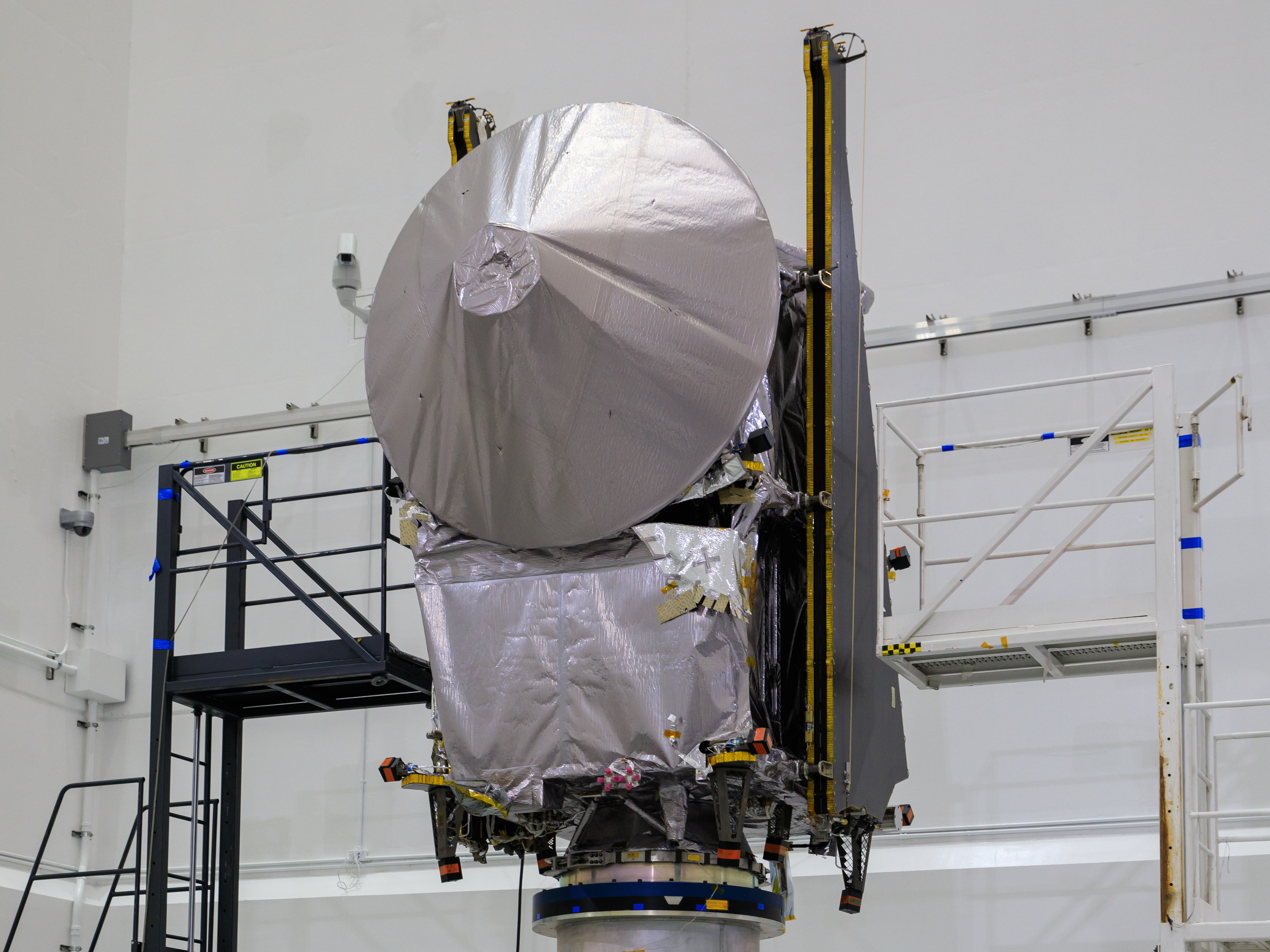
Lucy spacecraft in launch configuration

Lucy has several different engines:

Nammo LEROS 1c:

- Count: 1
- Type: hypergolic bipropellant engine
- Propellant: MON/Hydrazine
- Thrust: 458 N (386–470 N)
- Specific Impulse: 324 s

Aerojet Rocketdyne MR-103J:

- Count: 8
- Type: catalytic monopropellant thruster
- Propellant: Hydrazine
- Thrust: 1 N (0.19–1.13 N)
- Specific Impulse: 202–224 s

Aerojet Rocketdyne MR-106L:

- Count: 6
- Type: catalytic monopropellant thruster
- Propellant: Hydrazine
- Thrust: 22 N (10–34 N)
- Specific Impulse: 228–235 s

== Flight ==
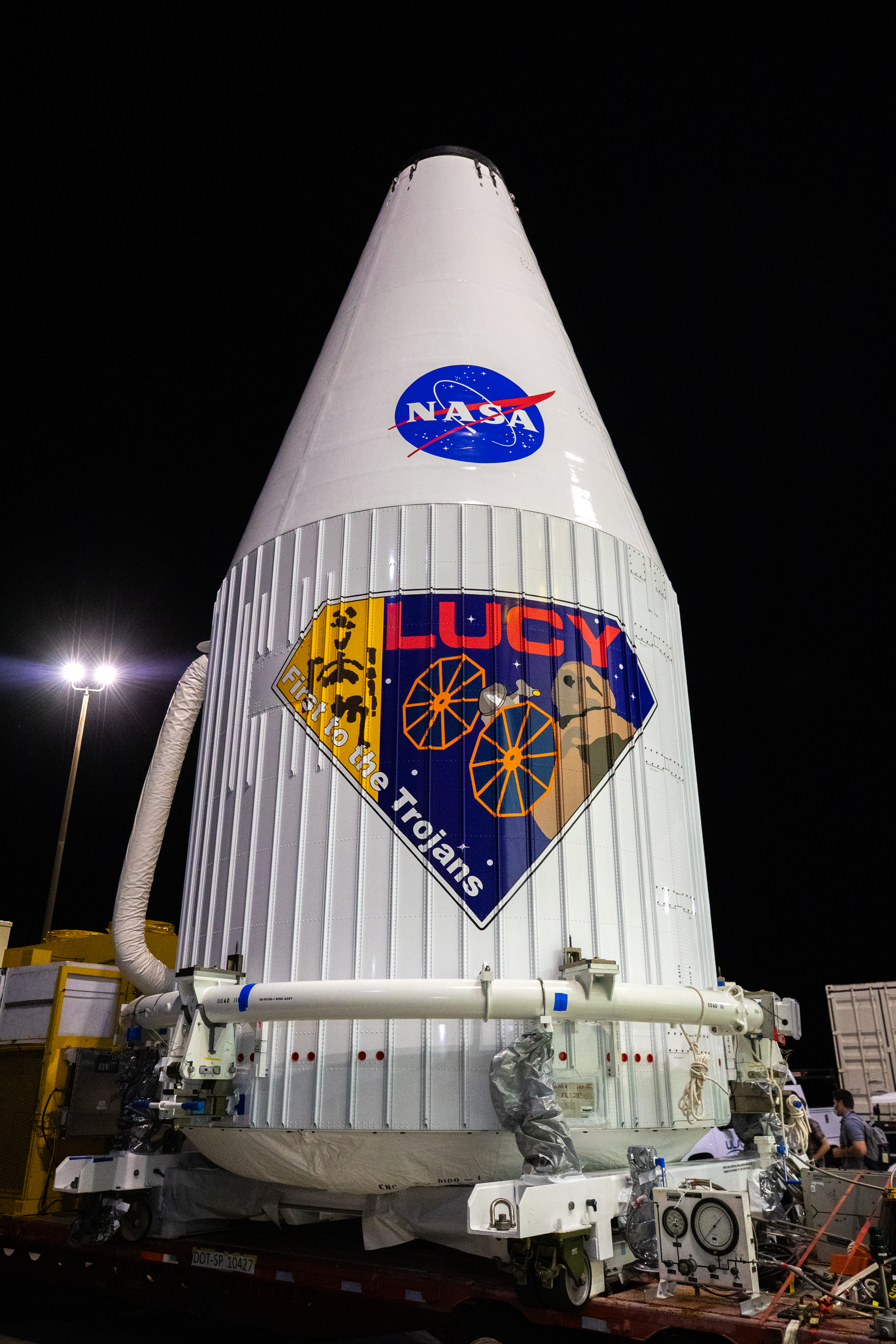
Lucy Rollout and Lift & Mate

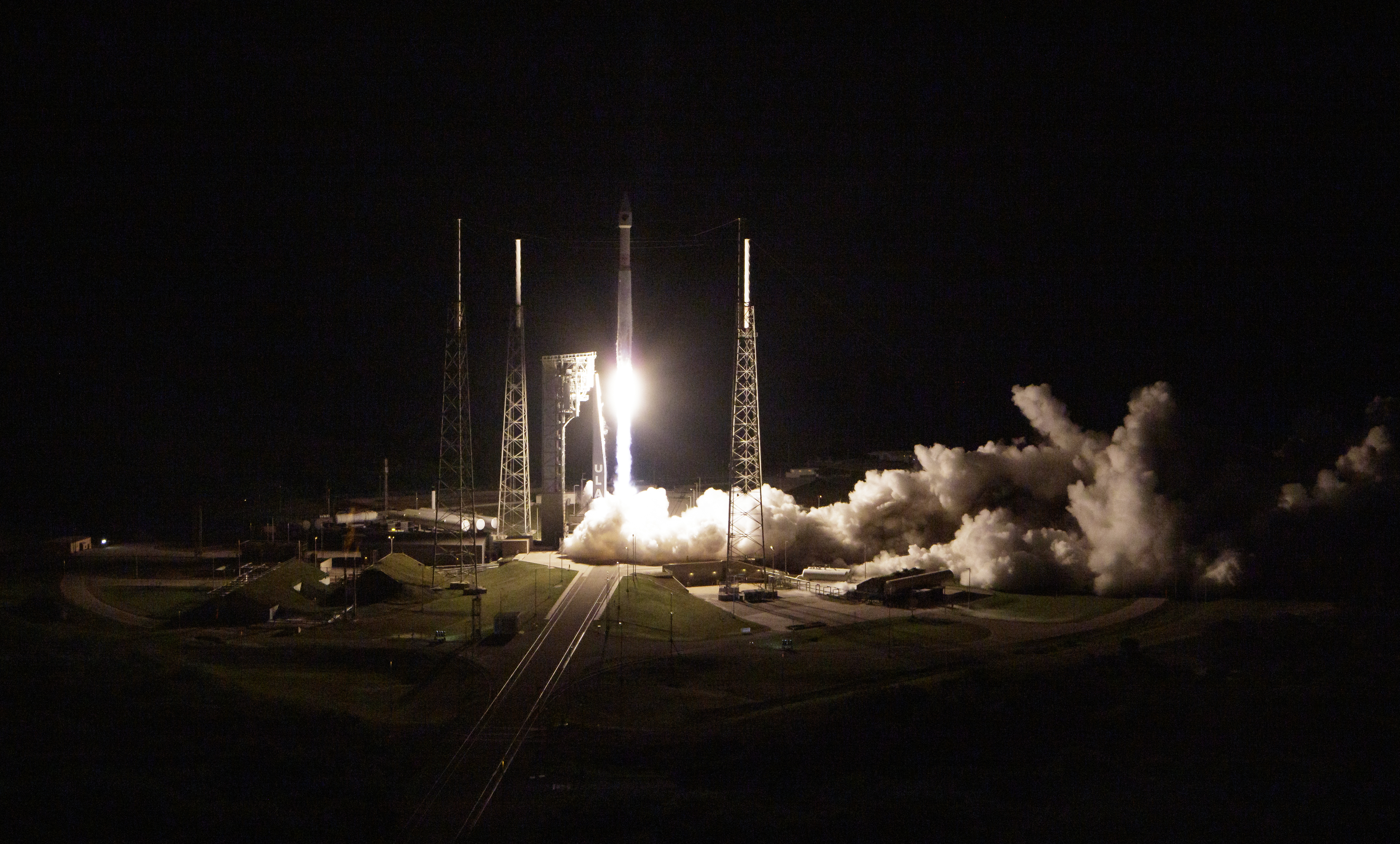
The launch on 16 October 2021 at 5:34 am EDT

Although the Lucy concept originated in late 2014, and was selected for funding in 2015, the Lucy spaceflight began on 16 October 2021 with the launch of the Lucy spacecraft aboard a United Launch Alliance Atlas V 401 launch vehicle into a stable parking orbit. During the next hour, the second stage reignited to place Lucy on an interplanetary trajectory in a heliocentric orbit on a twelve-year mission to two groups of Sun–Jupiter Trojan asteroids as well as close flybys of main belt asteroids during one of three planned passes through the asteroid belt. If the spacecraft remains operational during the 12-year planned duration, it is likely the mission will be extended and directed to additional asteroid targets.

=== Solar array deployment problems ===
On 16 October 2021, Lucy began to unfurl its two solar arrays. While the initial deployment of the arrays appeared to go smoothly, it was later discovered that one of the solar arrays failed to latch securely into open position. Thomas Zurbuchen, NASA's associate administrator for science, stressed the spacecraft remained "safe and stable". Later testing on 26 October indicated the affected array was between 75 and 95 percent of full deployment. As of January 2022, the spacecraft is in cruise mode. NASA has stated they are reviewing a range of potential options, including simply letting the array remain as it is. In late January 2022 NASA announced that they had found the cause for the failure of one of the solar arrays to fully deploy and then latch open securely. At the time, the agency's view was that there were two options to proceed: try to redeploy the solar array by further running of the array deployment motor, or leave the array as is, i.e. make no further attempt to fully open and latch it. Even with one solar array only partially deployed, the spacecraft was generating enough power for the mission. NASA said it would consider thoroughly its options and only take action at a (much) later time, as the issue was not an imminent risk to the mission.

On 9 May 2022, Lucy executed its first step in completing the deployment of the unlatched solar array. This was not intended to fully deploy and latch the array but simply to validate that the team's ground testing adequately represented the array-latch problem. After reviewing the data, the next planned step was for another deployment effort.

By 5 August 2022, NASA reported that solar array was between 353 degrees and 357 degrees open (out of 360 degrees) but not latched, making it stable enough for the spacecraft to operate as needed for mission operations. After an intervention attempt on 13 December 2022, the team suspended further work with the solar panels.

=== First flyby of Earth ===
Although problems pertaining to the solar arrays of Lucy had arose, they were being worked through with the date of the spacecraft's first Earth flyby remaining unchanged. In May 2022, months before the flyby, Lucy's L'LORRI insturment was able to observe a total lunar eclipse in which it saw the Moon fall into Earth's shadow from around 100,000,000 km (64,000,000 mi) away.

Approaching from the direction of the Sun, Lucy was able to conduct an instrument calibration sequence, including images of Earth and the Moon being taken by the T2CAMS in the days leading towards the flyby. Lucy's closest approach to Earth occurred on 16 October 2022, exactly one year after its launch, at an altitude of 300 km (186 mi) above the planet.

=== Flyby of 152830 Dinkinesh ===
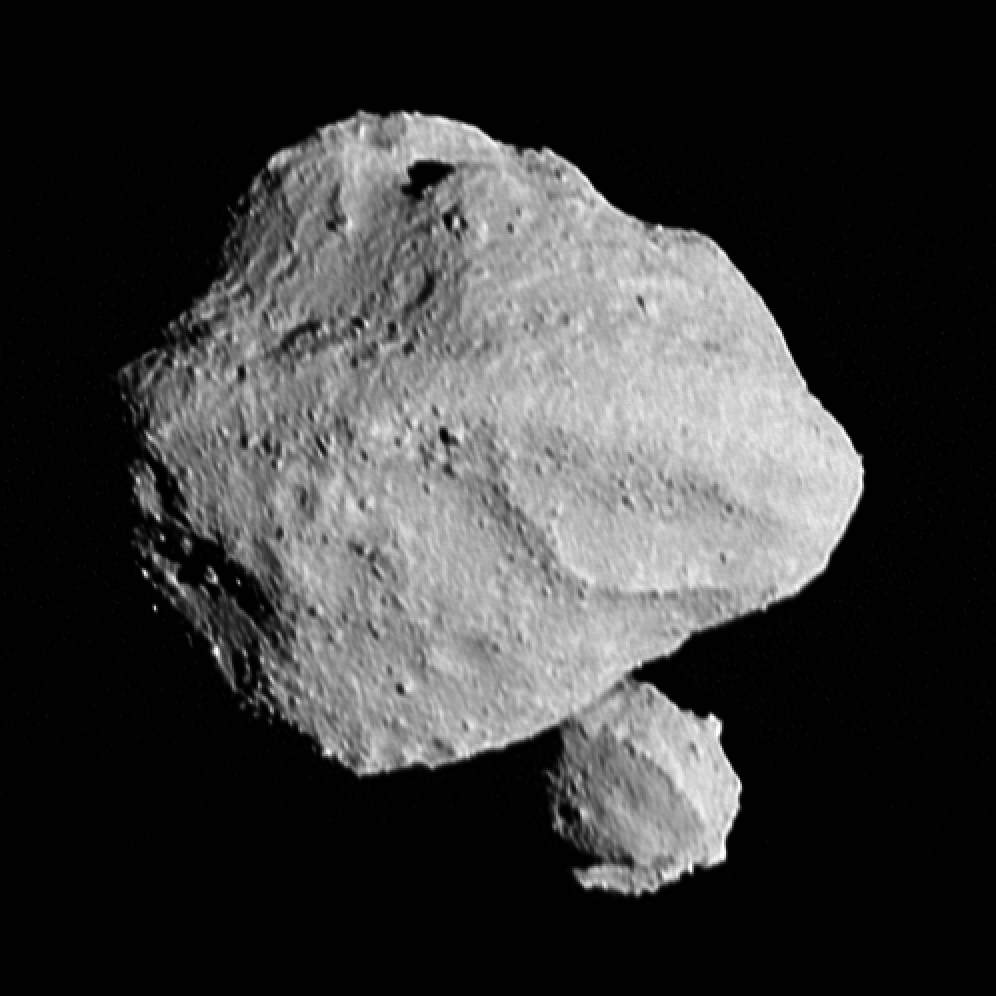
Dinkinesh and Selam as seen by L'LORRI from a distance of about 430 km (270 mi), one minute before closest approach.

On 25 January 2023, NASA announced that Lucy would fly by the main-belt asteroid 152830 Dinkinesh, which was previously overlooked as a potential target because the asteroid was too small. Lucy's original trajectory took it within 64,000 km (40,000 mi) of the asteroid, but a series of maneuvers from May to September 2023 moved the spacecraft's trajectory closer to the asteroid.

On 1 November 2023, Lucy successfully flew by its first target, 152830 Dinkinesh, at a relative speed of 4.5 km/s (2.8 mi/s). On the following day, NASA released images from the flyby and announced the discovery of a small satellite orbiting Dinkinesh. The first images from the flyby showed that Dinkinesh is approximately 790 m (2,590 ft) in diameter, while the satellite is approximately 220 m (720 ft) in diameter. Later images showed that the satellite was actually two objects in direct contact, known as a contact binary. The discovery of Dinkinesh's satellite brought the total number of Lucy's planned asteroid visits up to eleven.

=== Second flyby of Earth ===
In terms of the planned main engine burns of Lucy's mission, the first would occur on 31 January 2024, lasting six minutes. The second (and largest) of them occurred three days later on 3 February, lasting thirty-six minutes. Together, roughly half of the spacecraft's onboard fuel would be taken up by the two engine burns, additionally setting it up for a second gravity assist from Earth.

Approaching from the direction of the Sun once again, Lucy crossed the orbit of the Moon ten hours before making its closest approach to Earth on 13 December 2024, at 350 km (220 mi) above the planet. As it came closer to Earth, the spacecraft began to slew sideways to keep itself stable in its low-altitude flyby, which helped it gain a 7 km/s (4.5 mi/s) velocity boost, relative to the Sun. Rotating back to its vertical orientation, Lucy would now be on its way through the asteroid belt and to its Jupiter trojan targets of the Greek camp.

=== Flyby of 52246 Donaldjohanson ===
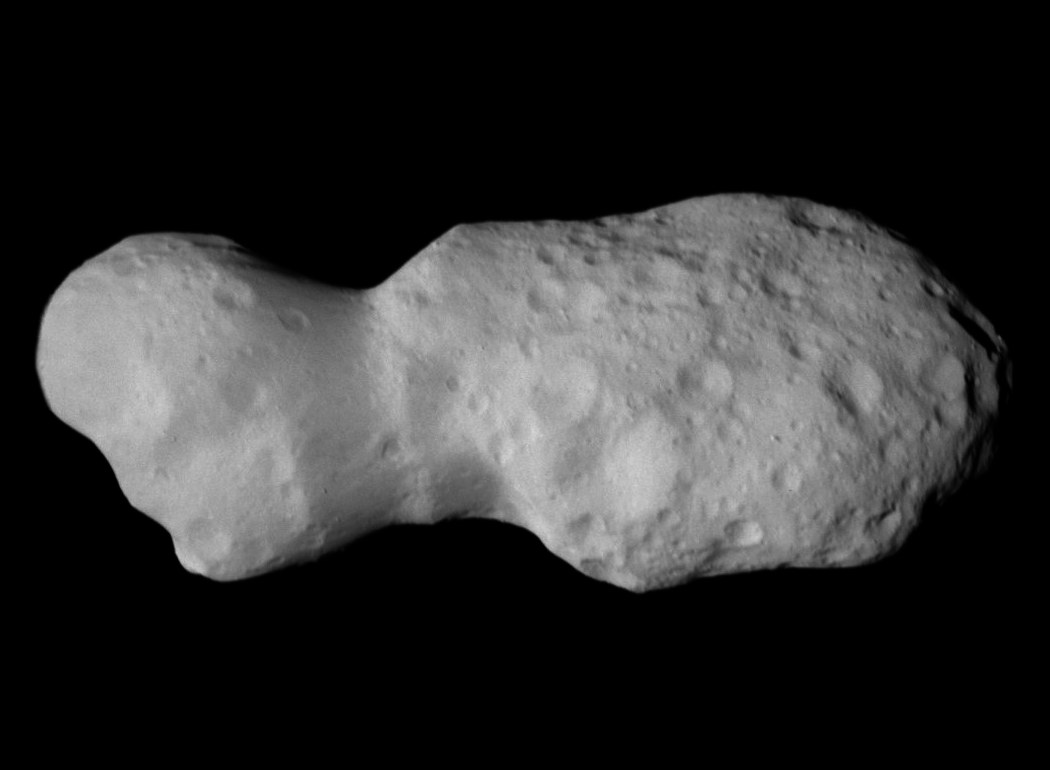
Donaldjohanson as seen by L’LORRI from a distance of about 2,700 km (1,700 mi), just over three minutes before closest approach.

Lucy first imaged 52246 Donaldjohanson on 25 February 2025, at a distance of 70 million kilometres (43 million miles).

On 20 April 2025, the spacecraft successfully flew by Donaldjohanson at a distance of 960 kilometres (600 mi) and a speed of more than 30,000 mph. The flyby, which was considered a "dress rehearsal" for Lucy's encounters with Trojan asteroids closer to Jupiter, involved Lucy autonomously tracking Donaldjohanson with its antenna facing away from Earth, precluding communications. Forty seconds before closest approach, Lucy stopped tracking Donaldjohanson to shield the spacecraft's instruments from the sun. The first set of images released the next day revealed that Donaldjohanson was a contact binary and larger than first predicted; at approximately 8 kilometres (5.0 mi) long and 3.5 kilometres (2.2 mi) wide at its widest point.

Animation of Lucy's trajectory

Around the Sun
21900 Orus

Around the Sun – frame rotating with Jupiter
Jupiter

Lucy · Sun · Earth · 52246 Donaldjohanson · 3548 Eurybates · 617 Patroclus

=== Observation of 3I/ATLAS ===
Lucy captured a series of photos between September 15–17, 2025 of Comet 3I/ATLAS using its high-resolution, black-and-white imager, L’LORRI, as the comet was zooming toward Mars. Lucy was 240 million miles away from 3I/ATLAS at the time.

== See also ==
- DESTINY+, a planned JAXA mission to fly by multiple asteroids.
- MBR Explorer, a planned UAESA mission to fly by various main belt asteroids.
- Jupiter Icy Moons Explorer, an ESA mission to the Jupiter system.
- OKEANOS, a proposed solar sail mission to Jupiter Trojans.
