= Harold F. Levison =

American planetary scientist

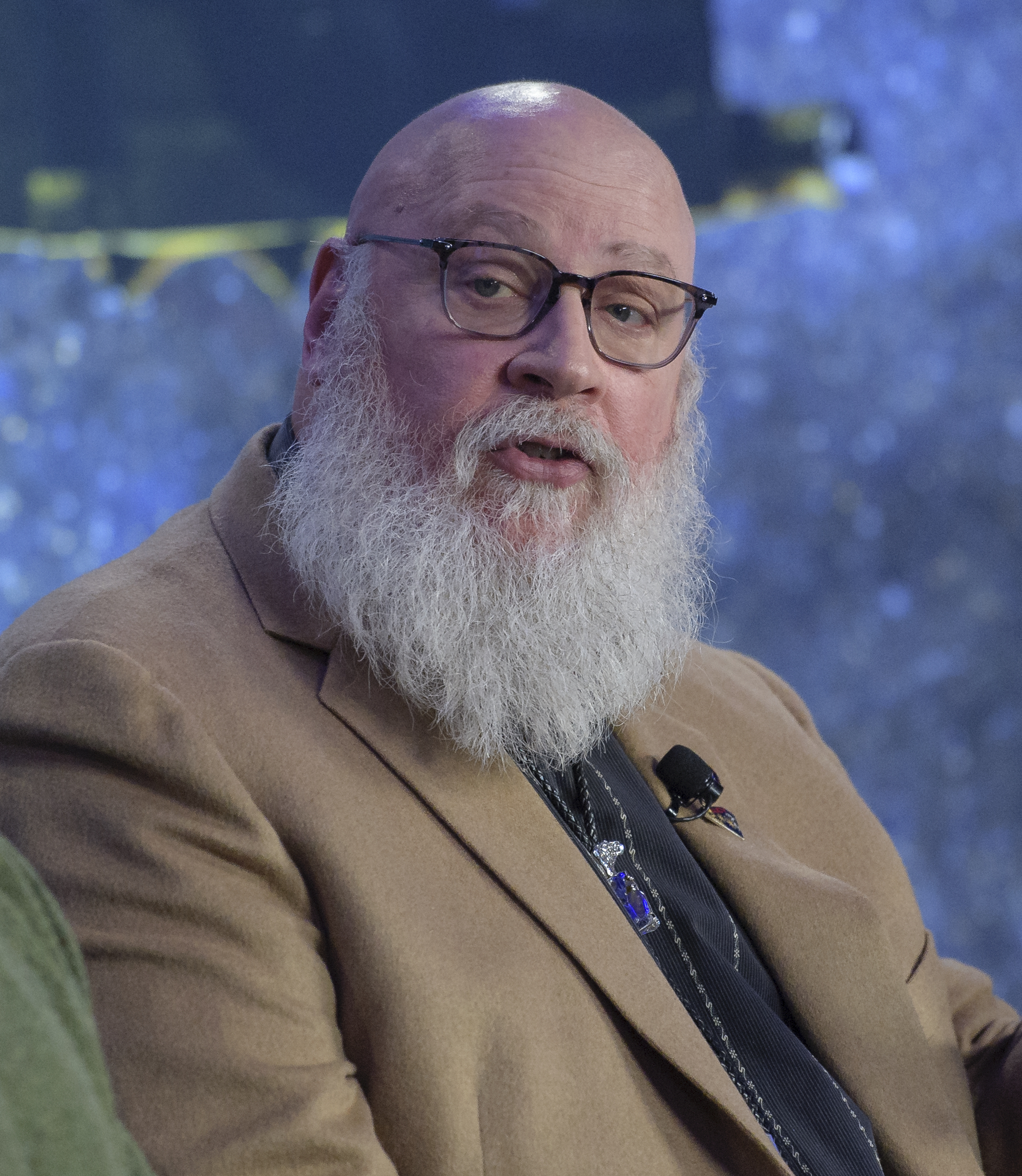
- Levison in 2019
- Born: Harold Levinson; March 1, 1959 (age 67); Philadelphia, Pennsylvania
- Education: Franklin and Marshall College
- Known for: Lucy
- Scientific career
- Fields: Planetary science
- Workplaces: Southwest Research Institute
- Doctoral advisor: D. O. Richstone

Harold F. (Hal) Levison (born 1959) is an American planetary scientist specializing in planetary dynamics. He currently works at the Southwest Research Institute, Boulder, Colorado, and studies planetary orbits and their evolution through Solar System history.

Levison is the Principal Investigator of the Lucy mission to tour multiple Jupiter trojans, which was selected as the thirteenth mission in NASA's Discovery Program in January 2017.

Among other achievements, Levison is the co-author of SWIFT, a commonly used symplectic integrator that solves planetary equations of motion for periods of billions of years.

Levison argued for a distinction between what are now called dwarf planets and the other eight planets based on their inability to "clear the neighborhood around their orbits", although his proposal suggested the terms "unterplanet" and "überplanet" and used the word "dwarf" to mean something else.
