= 152830 Dinkinesh =

Main belt asteroid target of the Lucy mission

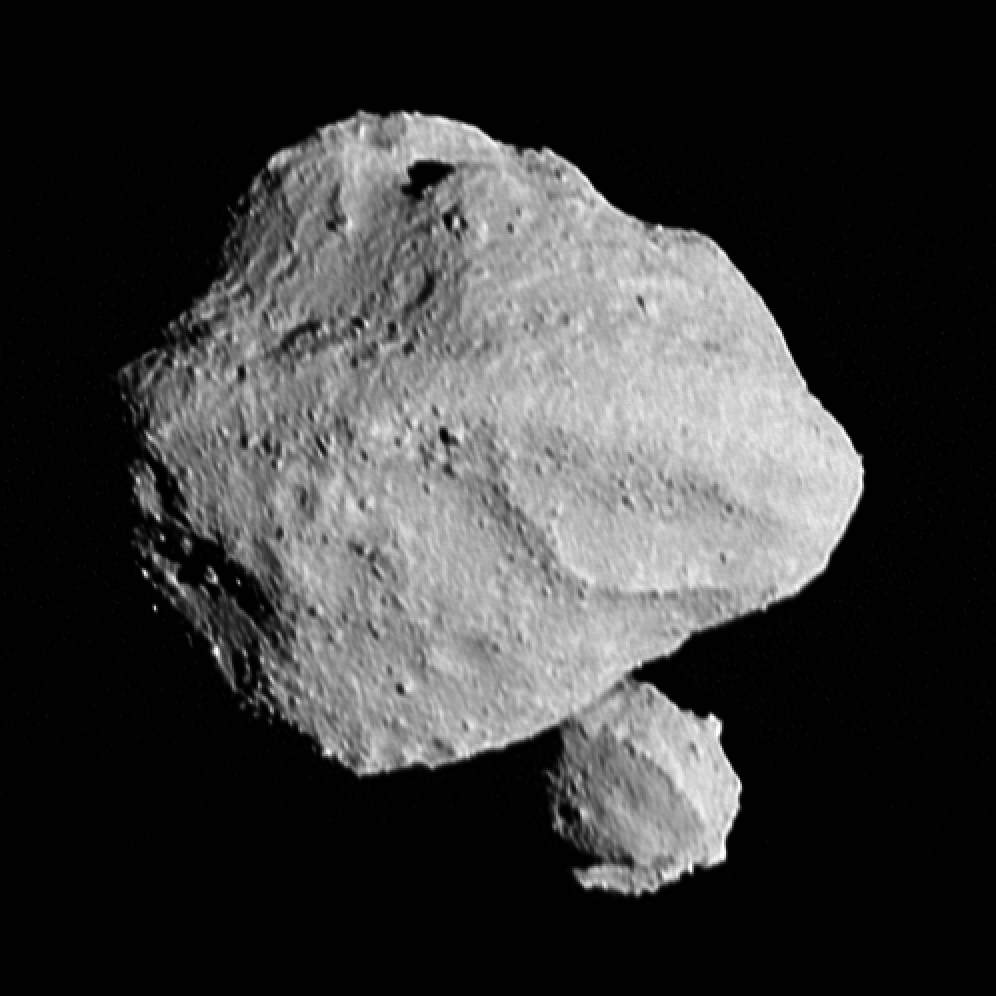
- Dinkinesh and its moon Selam imaged by the Lucy spacecraft's L'LORRI camera

Discovery
- Discovered by: LINEAR
- Discovery site: Lincoln Lab ETS
- Discovery date: 4 November 1999

Designations
- Pronunciation: /ˈdɪŋkɪnɛʃ/
- Named after: Dənkʼə näš (Lucy fossil)
- Alternative designations: 1999 VD_{57} · 2004 HJ_{78} · 2007 CB_{63}
- Minor planet category: main-belt · (inner)

Orbital characteristics
- Epoch 25 February 2023 (JD 2460000.5)
- Uncertainty parameter 0
- Observation arc: 23.06 yr (8,422 days)
- Earliest precovery date: 15 October 1999
- Aphelion: 2.437 AU
- Perihelion: 1.946 AU
- Semi-major axis: 2.191 AU
- Eccentricity: 0.1120
- Orbital period (sidereal): 3.24 yr (1,185 days)
- Mean anomaly: 25.239°
- Mean motion: 0° 18^{m} 13.874^{s} / day
- Inclination: 2.094°
- Longitude of ascending node: 21.380°
- Argument of perihelion: 66.711°
- Known satellites: 1 (Selam)

Physical characteristics
- Dimensions: 910 × 870 × 716 m
- Mean diameter: 738 m (volume equivalent)
- Volume: (2.1±0.2)×10^{8} m^{3}
- Mass: 4.67×10^{11} kg
- Mean density: 2.22±0.35 g/cm^{3}
- Synodic rotation period: 3.7387±0.0013 h
- Axial tilt: 178.7°±0.5°
- Geometric albedo: 0.27+0.25 −0.06
- Spectral type: Sq; V–R = 0.455±0.025
- Absolute magnitude (H): 17.62±0.04 (V-band)

152830 Dinkinesh (provisional designation 1999 VD_{57}) is a binary main-belt asteroid about 740 meters (2,400 feet) in diameter. It was discovered by the Lincoln Near-Earth Asteroid Research (LINEAR) survey at Socorro, New Mexico on 4 November 1999. Dinkinesh, the name borrowed from an Ethiopian word for the Lucy fossil, was the first flyby target of NASA's Lucy mission, which approached 425 km (264 mi) from the asteroid on 1 November 2023. During the flyby, the Lucy spacecraft discovered that Dinkinesh has a contact-binary natural satellite, named Selam, which is 220 meters (720 ft) in diameter. Dinkinesh is the smallest main-belt asteroid explored by spacecraft yet, though some smaller near-Earth asteroids have also been explored.

== Discovery and observational history ==
Dinkinesh was discovered on 4 November 1999 by the Lincoln Near-Earth Asteroid Research (LINEAR) sky survey at Socorro, New Mexico. The discovery observations were published by the Minor Planet Center (MPC) on 23 November 1999 and the asteroid was given the minor planet provisional designation 1999 VD_{57}, which describes its discovery year, month, and discovery order within the month. The LINEAR and Spacewatch (Kitt Peak, Arizona) surveys continued observing Dinkinesh until 15 November 1999, after which the asteroid became lost and went unrecognized for years.

On 19 April 2004, Spacewatch reobserved Dinkinesh as a seemingly new asteroid, but misattributed these observations to those of another unrelated asteroid, 2004 GZ_{43}, which was discovered by the same survey on 12 April 2004. Dinkinesh was again reobserved as a seemingly new asteroid on 15 and 17 February 2007 by Palomar Observatory's Near-Earth Asteroid Tracking (NEAT) survey at San Diego County, California, which led the MPC to give Dinkinesh the provisional designation 2007 CB_{63} on 25 February 2007. Gareth V. Williams, the associate director of the MPC at the time, recognized that 1999 VD_{57} and 2007 CB_{63} were the same asteroid and published the linkage on 2 March 2007. The linkage between Dinkinesh's 1999 and 2007 observations enabled the MPC to find additional observations from 2001 to 2007, where the asteroid was previously detected unknowingly. The linkage and additional observations extended Dinkinesh's observation arc to over 7 years and greatly reduced uncertainties in its orbit. This allowed the MPC to give Dinkinesh its permanent minor planet catalog number 152830 on 2 April 2007. Pre-discovery LINEAR observations of Dinkinesh from 15 October 1999 were later identified and published on 19 August 2007, extending the observation arc by another 5 years.

On 3 March 2007, the MPC established that Spacewatch's 2004 observations of Dinkinesh were not of 2004 GZ_{43}, and thus redesignated these observations as 2004 HJ_{78}. However, the MPC did not recognize that 2004 HJ_{78} was Dinkinesh until Gareth Williams made the linkage and published it on 9 February 2009.

== Name ==
Dinkinesh is the Amharic name for the Lucy fossil, after which NASA's Lucy mission is named. The name means "you are wonderful" in the Amharic language (ድንቅነሽ). "Dinkʼi" means "wonderful" and "nesh" means "you are" in feminine form. The asteroid was unnamed when it was selected for exploration by the Lucy spacecraft, so the Lucy mission team proposed the name Dinkinesh to the International Astronomical Union's Working Group for Small Bodies Nomenclature (WGSBN), which approved and announced the name on 6 February 2023.

== Orbit ==
Dinkinesh orbits the Sun in the inner main asteroid belt on an elliptical orbit with an average distance of 2.19 astronomical units (328 million km, 204 million mi) and an orbital period of 3.24 years. With an orbital eccentricity of 0.112, Dinkinesh comes as close as 1.95 AU (292 million km; 181 million mi) from the Sun at perihelion to as far as 2.44 AU (365 million km; 227 million mi) at aphelion. The asteroid's orbit is inclined 2.1° with respect to the plane of the Solar System. Dinkinesh is possibly a member of the Flora family, a group of asteroids that share similar orbital characteristics as the family's parent asteroid 8 Flora.

== Physical characteristics ==
=== Geology ===
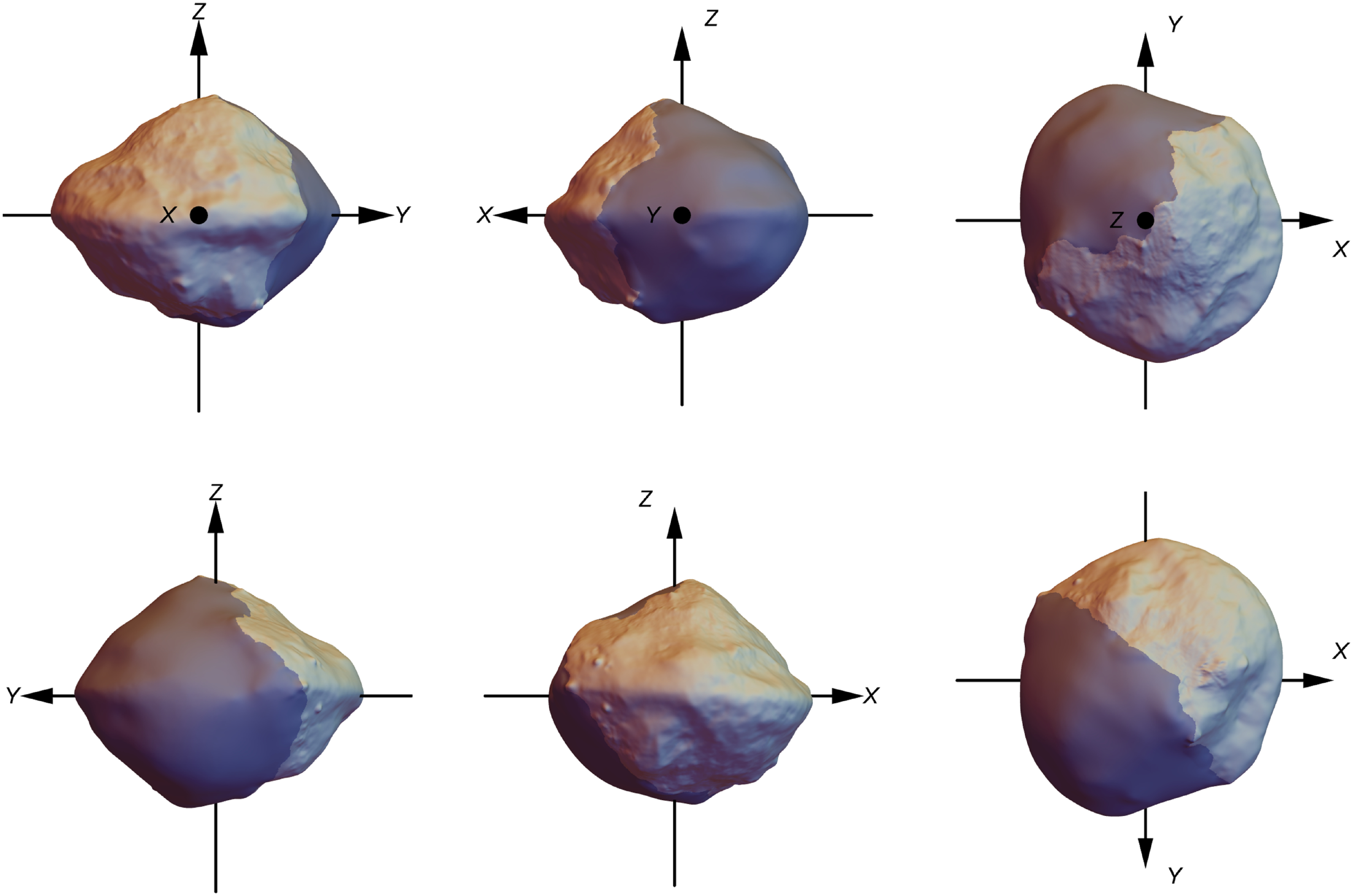
Shape model of Dinkinesh viewed from six orthogonal directions, with the +z direction representing Dinkinesh's rotational north pole.

Geological features on Dinkinesh are formally named after words for 'wonderful,' 'marvelous,' or 'beautiful' in the languages of the world. This naming theme was introduced by the International Astronomical Union, which announced the first approved names for Selam's features on 20 December 2024.

The surfaces of Dinkinesh and Selam are covered with boulders and craters. The outline of Dinkinesh's shape is not smooth, which suggests that the asteroid is relatively old. Dinkinesh bears an equatorial ridge that has been named Fab Dorsum, which suggests that the asteroid has experienced mass shedding in the past. Dinkinesh's equatorial ridge also has a secondary ridge that branches off it. Dinkinesh's shape resembles the near-Earth asteroids 101955 Bennu and 162173 Ryugu, which are known to have rubble pile interior structures consisting of rocks and dust loosely held by gravity. Because of this similarity, Dinkinesh is thought to likely have a rubble pile structure as well.

Labelled image of Dinkinesh and Selam showing named surface features

Named features on Dinkinesh
Feature	Center Coordinates	Description	Named after	Name approved (Date · Ref)
Bella Dorsum	24.40°N, 311.1°W	Elliptical ridge with northern and southern arcs	Italian word for "beautiful"	2025-12-20 · WGPSN
Fab Dorsum	0°N	Prominent equatorial ridge	English word derived from "fabulous"	2025-12-20 · WGPSN
Indah Fossa	-8.52°N, 4.31°W	Long, narrow trough that appears to postdate other features	Indonesian word for "beautiful"	2025-12-20 · WGPSN
Sumak Fossa	0.0°N, 354.0°W	Large trough	Kichwa (Ecuadorian Quechua) word for "beautiful"	2025-12-20 · WGPSN
Totoka Saxum	2.3°N, 356.9°W	Boulder used to define the prime meridian	Fijian word for "beautiful"	2025-12-20 · WGPSN

=== Surface composition ===
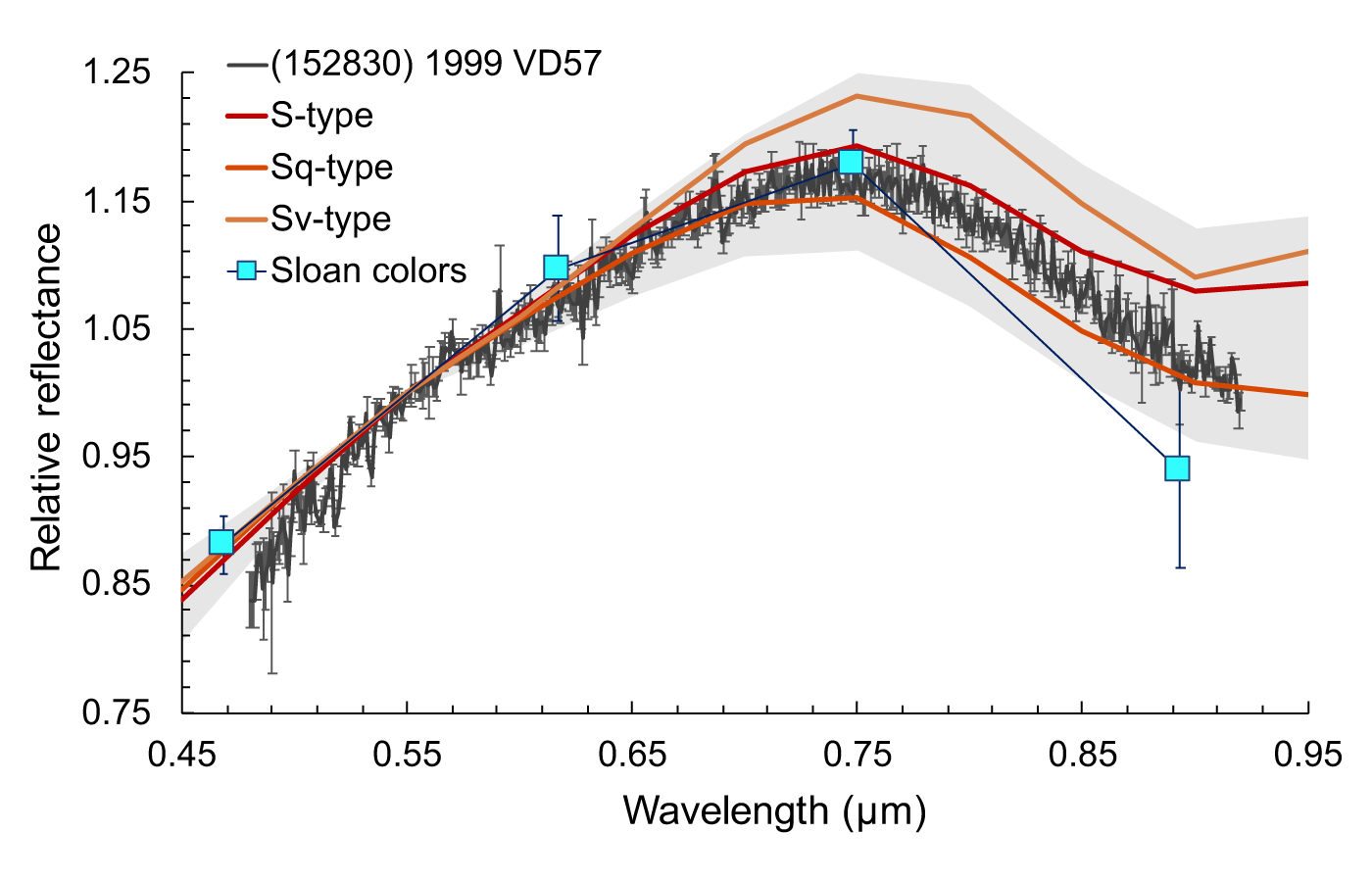
Visible light spectrum of Dinkinesh (gray) compared to the spectra of S-, Sq-, and Sv-type asteroids (red, orange, and yellow, respectively)

Visible light spectroscopy of Dinkinesh by two independent teams of researchers in November–December 2022 showed that it is an S-type asteroid, meaning it is mainly composed of rocky silicates and small amounts of metal. Spectral data obtained from the 10-meter Keck I telescope at Mauna Kea, Hawaii indicates that Dinkinesh belongs to the Sq subclass of S-type asteroids because it exhibits the 1 μm olivine and pyroxene spectral absorption band that is characteristically seen in Q-type asteroids. On the other hand, spectral data from the 8.1-meter Gemini South telescope at Cerro Pachón, Chile showed that Dinkinesh's spectrum more closely resembles a standard S-type asteroid with a shallower 1 μm band. This difference between the two measured spectra of Dinkinesh may be caused by either observational artifacts or compositional variations across Dinkinesh's surface as it rotates. If the latter possibility is true, then Dinkinesh's varying 1 μm band would indicate that there is space-weathered material that is unevenly distributed across its surface, likely due to impacts and surface topography.

=== Rotation and light curve ===
Dinkinesh rotates every 3.7387±0.0013 h. As Dinkinesh rotates, its brightness from Earth fluctuates due to its non-spherical shape, which can be inferred from the amplitude of the asteroid's rotational light curve. The first photometric observations of Dinkinesh's rotational light curve were attempted with the Teide Observatory's 0.8-m IAC-80 telescope at Tenerife, Spain in November 2022, but it did not observe Dinkinesh long enough to make conclusive findings. Longer photometric observations of Dinkinesh were made with the Calar Alto Observatory's 1.23-m telescope at Almería, Spain from November 2022 to February 2023, which observed that Dinkinesh's brightness fluctuates by 0.39±0.02 magnitudes every 52.67 hours. Dinkinesh's rotation does not cause this light curve period; rather, it is caused by the tidally locked rotation of Selam, whose elongated shape produces the observed brightness fluctuations.

=== Diameter and albedo ===
Lucy images of Dinkinesh show that it measures approximately 790 m (2,590 ft) across its equator. This is in agreement with the previous diameter estimates from measured absolute magnitude and average S-type asteroid albedo. Reprocessing of archival infrared thermal emission observations by the Wide-field Infrared Survey Explorer (WISE) from March 2010 give a consistent result.

== Satellite ==
During its flyby of Dinkinesh, the Lucy spacecraft discovered that the asteroid has a contact binary natural satellite or moon consisting of two conjoined lobes each around 220 m (720 ft) in diameter. The moon of Dinkinesh has been named Selam (/səˈlɑːm/), after the eponymous fossil remains of a three-year-old Australopithecus afarensis female hominin (the same species as the Lucy fossil) found in Dikika, Ethiopia.

Together, Dinkinesh and Selam form a binary asteroid system. Dinkinesh is the second binary main-belt asteroid explored by spacecraft, after 243 Ida by Galileo in 1993. The Dinkinesh binary system resembles the 65803 Didymos near-Earth asteroid binary system in size and composition, but differs in location from the Sun, which allows scientists to compare the nature of binary asteroids in different environments. In the weeks prior to the flyby, the Lucy spacecraft found that Dinkinesh's brightness did not vary as predicted, which provided the first hints of Dinkinesh's binary nature. Images of Selam taken after Lucy's approach revealed that it is a contact binary with two lobes attached to each other. While contact binary asteroids are common in the Solar System, Selam is the first known example of a contact binary satellite of an asteroid.

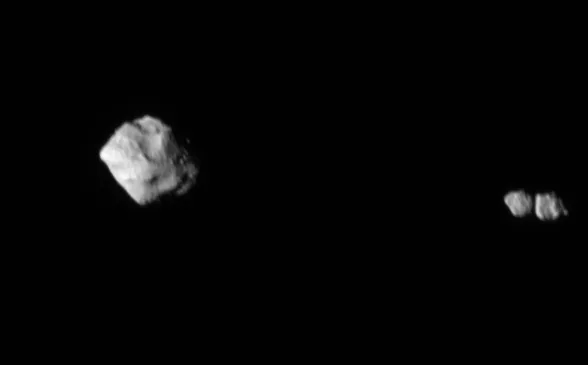
Dinkinesh and Selam imaged six minutes after closest approach, revealing the satellite's contact binary shape

Dinkinesh and Selam imaged by Lucy's terminal tracking camera during approach. Selam's apparent motion is primarily due to the changing perspective during Lucy's approach.

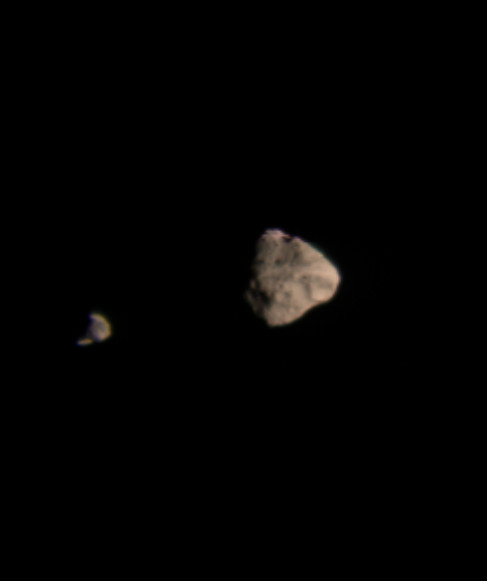
Dinkinesh and Selam imaged in false color by Lucy's L'Ralph imager

== Exploration ==
The Lucy spacecraft made a flyby of Dinkinesh from a distance of 425 km (264 mi) on 1 November 2023 16:54 UTC. Lucy's flyby of Dinkinesh was announced by NASA and the Lucy science team on 25 January 2023, more than one year after Lucy had launched in October 2021. The asteroid was initially overlooked as a potential flyby target because it was too small. It was identified in August 2022 by Raphael Marschall, mission collaborator of the Nice Observatory, who investigated 500,000 asteroids for potential close approaches with the spacecraft. The original trajectory of Lucy took it within 64,000 km (40,000 mi) of Dinkinesh, but a series of planned trajectory correction maneuvers from May to September 2023 allowed Lucy to approach much closer.

Dinkinesh was Lucy's first and smallest asteroid flyby during its mission, and is the smallest main-belt asteroid explored by spacecraft yet. The Dinkinesh flyby served to test Lucy's autonomous tracking capabilities before it will apply them to its main science targets, the Jupiter trojans. Lucy took its first images of Dinkinesh on 3–5 September 2023, when the asteroid was 23 million km (14 million mi) away from the spacecraft. The spacecraft continued imaging Dinkinesh from afar to aid its optical navigation over the days before the flyby. Because Dinkinesh is very small, Lucy did not resolve surface detail on Dinkinesh until the day of the flyby. At closest approach, Lucy was moving 4.5 km/s (2.8 mi/s) relative to Dinkinesh and it was expected to take 2 meters/pixel resolution images of the asteroid with the panchromatic L'LORRI imager, 15 m/pixel color images with the L'Ralph imager, and 24 m/pixel near-infrared spectra and thermal measurements with the L'TES spectrometer. After the flyby, Lucy's L'LORRI instrument continued observing Dinkinesh for four days to measure the asteroid's light curve.

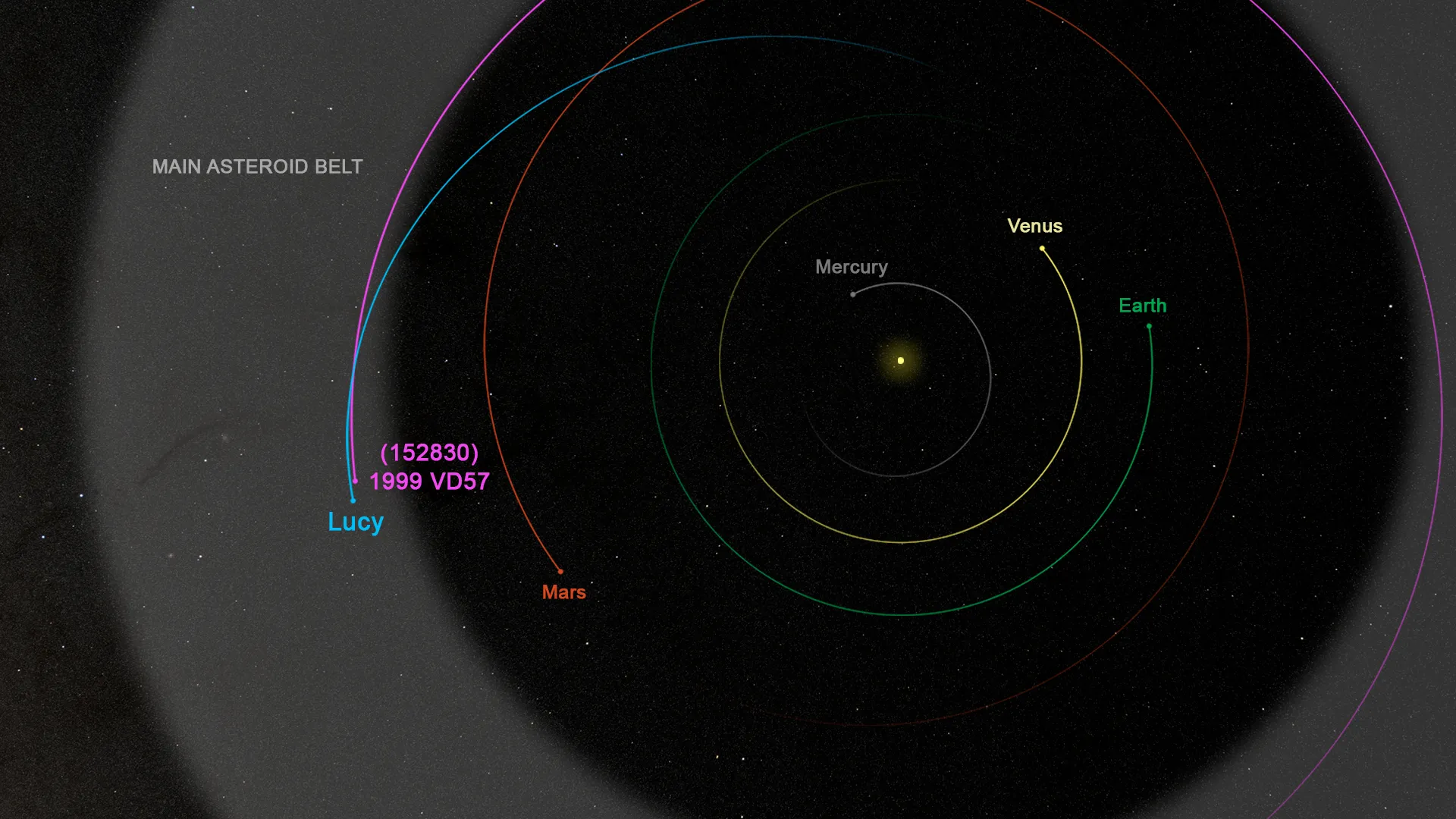
Orbit diagram of Lucy's flyby of Dinkinesh (1999 VD_{57}) on 1 November 2023

First images of Dinkinesh (circled) by the Lucy spacecraft in September 2023

== See also ==
- 52246 Donaldjohanson, Lucy's next flyby target in 2025
- List of minor planets and comets visited by spacecraft
