= Contact binary (small Solar System body) =

Small Solar System body that is composed of two bodies

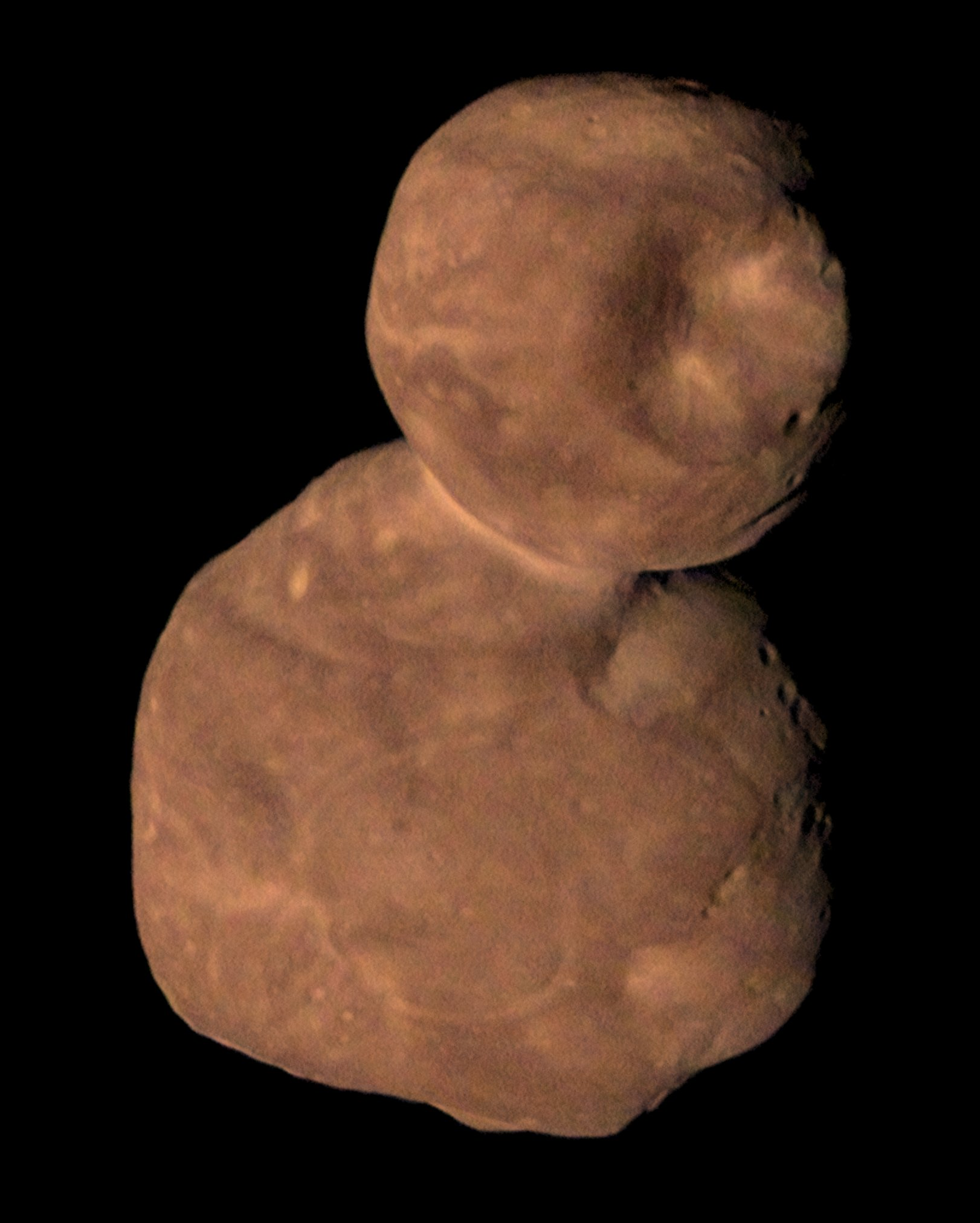
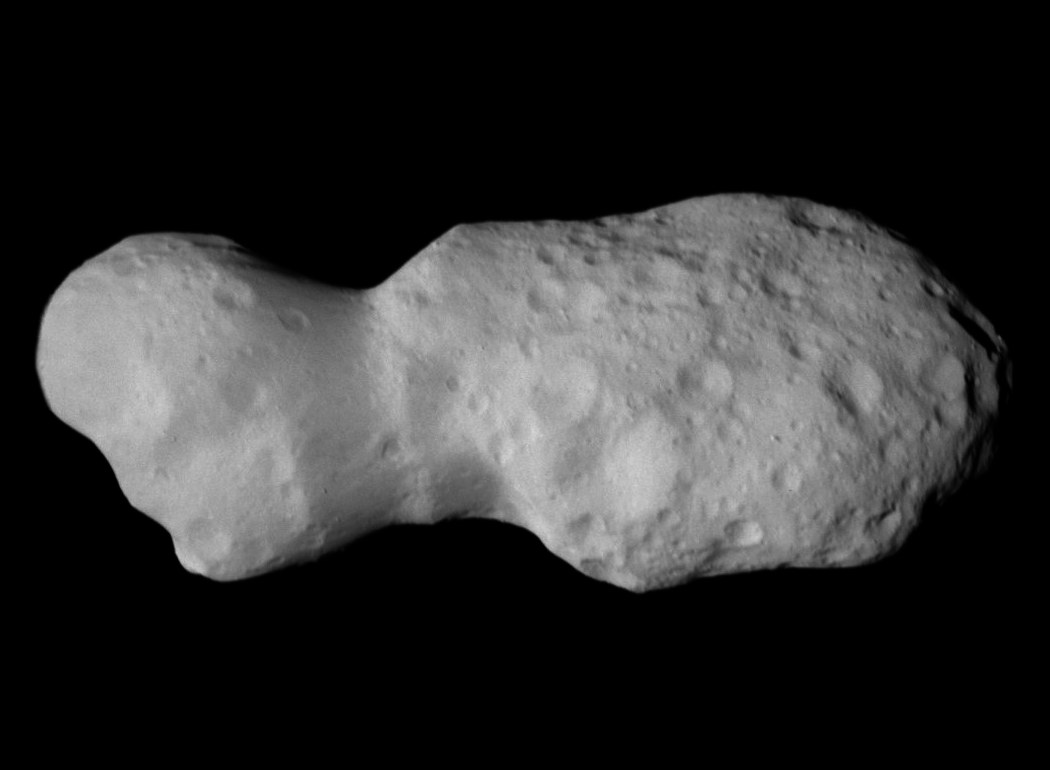
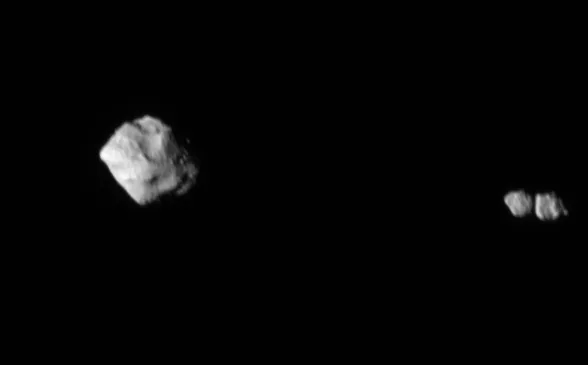
Contact binaries of varying probability among the small Solar System bodies:
- Top-Left: Kuiper belt object 486958 Arrokoth photographed by the New Horizons probe
- Top-Right: Comet 67P/Churyumov–Gerasimenko, with two distinct lobes connected by a "neck" as seen by the Rosetta probe
- Bottom-Left: Main-belt asteroid 52246 Donaldjohanson photographed by the Lucy probe
- Bottom-Right: Main-belt asteroid 152830 Dinkinesh and its contact binary satellite Selam photographed by Lucy

A contact binary is a small Solar System body, such as a minor planet or comet, that is composed of two bodies that have gravitated toward each other until they touch, resulting in a bilobated, peanut-like overall shape. Contact binaries are distinct from true binary systems such as binary asteroids where both components are separated. The term is also used for stellar contact binaries.

An example of a contact binary is the Kuiper belt object 486958 Arrokoth, which was imaged by the New Horizons spacecraft during its flyby in January 2019.

== History ==
The existence of contact binary asteroids was first speculated by planetary scientist Allan F. Cook in 1971, who sought for potential explanations for the extremely elongated shape of the Jupiter trojan asteroid 624 Hektor, whose longest axis measures roughly 300 km (190 mi) across and is twice as long as its shorter axes according to light curve measurements. Astronomers William K. Hartmann and Dale P. Cruikshank performed further investigation into Cook's contact binary hypothesis in 1978 and found it to be a plausible explanation for Hektor's elongated shape. They argued that since Hektor is the largest Jupiter trojan, its elongated shape could not have originated from the fragmentation of a larger asteroid. Rather, Hektor is more likely a "compound asteroid" consisting of two similarly-sized primitive asteroids, or planetesimals, that are in contact with each other as a result of a very low-speed collision. Hartmann theorized in 1979 that Jupiter trojan planetesimals formed close together with similar motions in Jupiter's Lagrange points, which allowed for low-speed collisions between planetesimals to take place and form contact binaries. The hypothesis of Hektor's contact binary nature contributed to the growing evidence of the existence of binary asteroids and asteroid satellites, which were not discovered until the Galileo spacecraft's flyby of 243 Ida and Dactyl in 1993.

Until 1989, contact binary asteroids had only been inferred from the high-amplitude U-shape of their light curves. The first visually confirmed contact binary was the near-Earth asteroid 4769 Castalia (formerly 1989 PB), whose double-lobed shape was revealed in high-resolution delay-Doppler radar imaging by the Arecibo Observatory and Goldstone Solar System Radar in August 1989. These radar observations were led by Steven J. Ostro and his team of radar astronomers, who published the results in 1990. In 1994, Ostro and his colleague R. Scott Hudson developed and published a three-dimensional shape model of Castalia reconstructed from the 1989 radar images, providing the first radar shape model of a contact binary asteroid.

In 1992, the Kuiper belt was discovered and astronomers subsequently began observing and measuring light curves of Kuiper belt objects (KBOs) to determine their shapes and rotational properties. In 2002–2003, then-graduate student Scott S. Sheppard and his advisor David C. Jewitt observed the KBO and plutino (139775) 2001 QG298 with the University of Hawaiʻi's 2.24-m telescope at Mauna Kea, as part of a survey dedicated to measuring the light curves of KBOs. With their results published in 2004, they discovered that 2001 QG_{298} exhibits a large, U-shaped light curve amplitude characteristic of contact binaries, providing the first evidence of contact binary KBOs. Sheppard and Jewitt identified additional contact binary candidates from other KBOs known to exhibit large light curve amplitudes, hinting that contact binaries are abundant in the Kuiper belt.

The contact binary nature of comets was first suspected after the Deep Space 1 spacecraft's flyby of 19P/Borrelly in 2001, which revealed a bilobate peanut-shaped nucleus with a thick neck connecting the two lobes. The nucleus of 1P/Halley has also been described as peanut-shaped by researchers in 2004, based on imagery from the Giotto and Vega probes in 1986. However, the low bifurcation and thick-necked shapes of both of these comet nuclei made it unclear whether they are truly contact binaries. In 2008, the Arecibo Observatory imaged the Halley-type comet 8P/Tuttle in radar and revealed a highly bifurcated nucleus consisting of two distinct spheroidal lobes, providing the first unambiguous evidence of a contact binary comet nucleus. Later radar imaging and spacecraft exploration of the Jupiter family comet 103P/Hartley in 2010 also revealed a thick-necked, peanut-shaped nucleus similar to 19P/Borelly. By that time, half of the comets that have been imaged in detail were known to be bilobate, which implied that contact binaries in the comet population are similarly abundant as contact binaries in other minor planet populations.

== Formation and evolution ==
In the Solar System, contact binary objects typically form when two objects collide at speeds slow enough to prevent disruption of their shapes. However, the mechanisms leading to this formation vary depending on the size and orbital location of the objects.

=== Near-Earth asteroids ===
Most near-Earth asteroids are the remnants of collisional fragments. Due to their close proximity to the Sun, the evolution of near-Earth asteroid (NEA) shapes and binary systems is dominated by the uneven reflection of sunlight off their surfaces, which causes gradual orbital acceleration by the Yarkovsky effect and gradual rotational acceleration by the Yarkovsky–O'Keefe–Radzievskii–Paddack (YORP) effect.

High-mass ratio and doubly-synchronous binary systems such as 69230 Hermes are plausible sources for contact binaries in the NEA population, since they are subject to the binary YORP effect, which acts over timescales of 1,000–10,000 years to either contract the components' orbits until they contact, or expand their orbits until they become gravitationally detached asteroid pairs. The origin of contact binaries from doubly-synchronous binaries in the NEA population is evident from the fact that very few doubly-synchronous binary NEAs are known, whereas contact binary NEAs are much more common. For doubly-synchronous binary systems with 1 km (0.62 mi)-diameter components, the tangential and radial impact velocities when they collide are less than 50 mm/s (2.0 in/s), which are low enough to not disrupt the shapes of the two bodies.

In 2007, Daniel J. Scheeres proposed that contact binary asteroids in the NEA population can undergo rotational fissioning after being rotationally accelerated by the YORP effect. Depending on the relative sizes and shapes of the fissioned components, there are three possible evolutionary pathways for contact binary NEAs. Firstly, if the primary component is elongated and dominates the mass of the system, the secondary will either escape the system or collide with the primary since the orbits of the fissioned components are unstable. Secondly, if the primary component is elongated and accounts for roughly half of the system's mass, the secondary can temporarily orbit the primary before it will collide with the primary, reforming the contact binary but with a different distribution of the system mass. Thirdly, if the primary is spheroidal and dominates the mass of the system, the fissioned components can remain in long-lasting orbits as a stable binary system. As shown by these cases, it is unlikely that fissioned contact binaries can form stable binaries.

In 2011, Seth A. Jacobson and Scheeres expanded upon their 2007 theory of binary fission and proposed that NEAs can go through repeated cycles of fissioning and reimpacting through the YORP effect.

=== Trans-Neptunian objects ===
In the trans-Neptunian region and especially the Kuiper belt, binary systems are thought to have formed from the direct collapse of gas and dust from the surrounding protoplanetary nebula due to streaming instability. Through impacts and gravitational perturbations by the outer planets, the mutual orbits of binary trans-Neptunian objects contract and eventually destabilize to form contact binaries.

== Geophysical properties ==
Impacts on one of the lobes of contact binary rubble pile asteroids do not cause significant disruption to the asteroid as the shockwave produced by the impact is damped by the asteroid's rubble pile structure and then blocked by the discontinuity between the two lobes.

== Occurrence ==
=== Near-Earth asteroids ===
In 2022, Anne Virkki and colleagues published an analysis of 191 near-Earth asteroids (NEAs) that were observed by the Arecibo Observatory radar from December 2017–2019. From this sample, they found that 10 out of the 33 (~30%) NEAs larger than 200 m (660 ft) in diameter were contact binaries, which is double the previously estimated percentage of 14% for contact binaries of this diameter in the NEA population. Although the sample size is small and therefore not statistically significant, it could imply that contact binaries could be more common than previously thought.

Some notable NEA contact binaries include: 4769 Castalia, 25143 Itokawa, 4179 Toutatis, and 98943 Torifune. Itokawa was photographed by the Hayabusa probe and appears to be a contact binary as a result of its elongated, bent body. Toutatis similarly has an with its elongated shape, as photographed by Chang'e-2, and is a contact binary candidate as well. Torifune was confirmed to be a contact binary after the Hayabusa2 probe flew by it on 5 July 2026.

=== Main Belt ===
52246 Donaldjohanson was confirmed to be a contact binary during the Lucy flyby of it in 2025. A notable main belt asteroid suspected of being a contact binary is 216 Kleopatra.

=== Jupiter Trojans ===
The largest Jupiter trojan, 624 Hektor is suspected of being a contact binary.

=== Kuiper belt ===
In 2015–2019, Audrey Thirouin and Scott Sheppard performed a survey of KBOs from the plutino (2:3 Neptune resonance) and cold classical (low inclination and eccentricity) populations with the Lowell Discovery Telescope and Magellan-Baade Telescope. They found that 40–50% of the population of plutinos smaller than 188–419 km (117–260 mi) in diameter (H ≥ 6) are contact binaries consisting of nearly equal-mass components, whereas at least 10–25% of the population of cold classical KBOs of the same size range are contact binaries. The differing contact binary fractions of these two populations imply they underwent different formation and evolution mechanisms.

Thirouin and Sheppard continued their survey of KBOs in 2019–2021, focusing on the twotino population in the 1:2 orbital resonance with Neptune. They found that 7–14% of twotinos are contact binaries, which is relatively low albeit similar to the contact binary fraction of the cold classical population. Thirouin and Sheppard noted that the twotinos' contact binary fraction is consistent with predictions by David Nesvorný and David Vokrouhlický in 2019, who suggested that 10–30% of dynamically excited and resonant Kuiper belt populations are contact binaries.

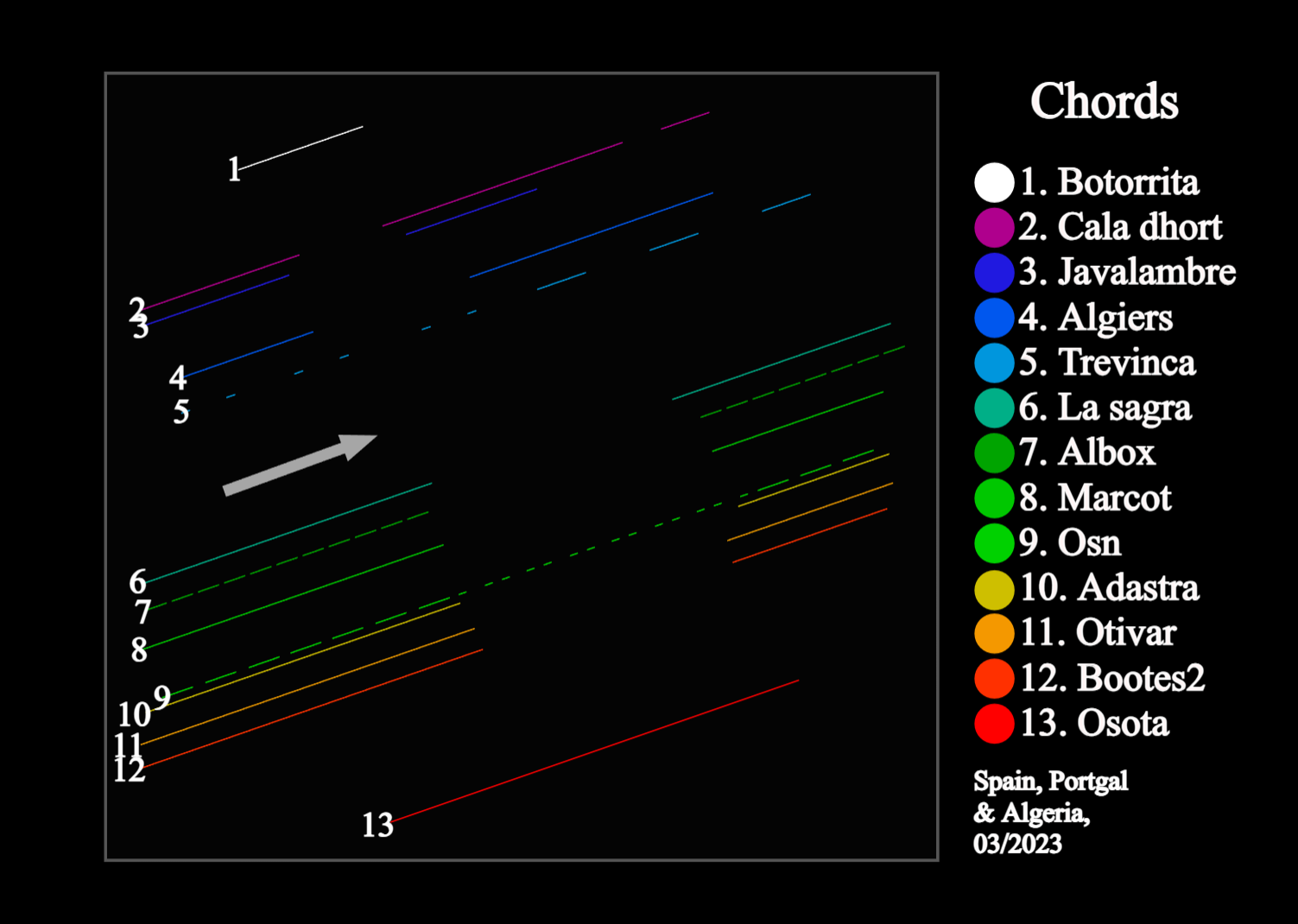
Occultation chords of 19521 Chaos, a potential contact binary

486958 Arrokoth is the first confirmed example of a contact binary KBO, seen through stellar occultations in 2018 and spacecraft imaging in 2019.

A stellar occultation by the KBO 19521 Chaos on 29 March 2023 revealed that it had an apparently bilobate shape 380 km (240 mi) across, which could potentially make it the largest known contact binary object in the Solar System. However, the bilobate shape seen in the occultation could well be two binary components transiting each other during the event; this is supported by the smaller-than-expected size of Chaos measured in the occultation.

Some other KBOs are suspected to be contact binaries due to their light curves. Examples of which are 58534 Logos and 385446 Manwë.

=== Comets ===
67P/Churyumov–Gerasimenko and 8P/Tuttle are most likely contact binaries. Halley's Comet and 19P/Borelly are suspected of being contact binaries.

=== Moons ===
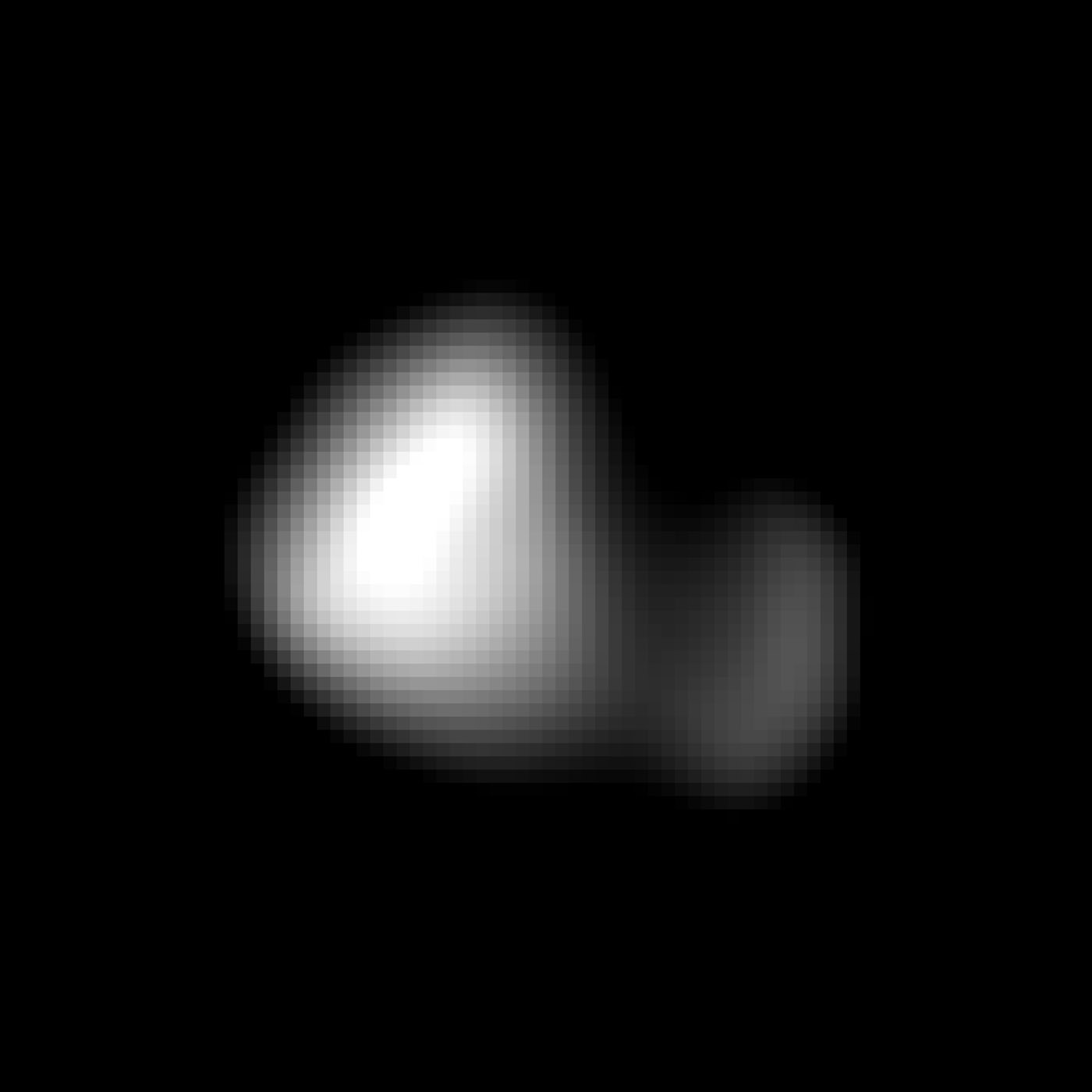
Kerberos imaged by New Horizons on 14 July 2015 from a distance of 396,100 km

The contact binary Selam orbits the small main-belt asteroid 152830 Dinkinesh. It was confirmed after the Lucy probe flew by it on 1 November 2023.

The second smallest moon of Pluto, Kerberos appeared bilobate when imaged by New Horizons. It is believed that Kerberos, alongside possibly Styx are contact binaries formed from remnant debris of a past collision between Pluto and its largest moon Charon. However, due to the small size of the two moons, and the distance at which they were imaged, Kerberos and Styx are poorly resolved.

The Cassini spacecraft observed several irregular moons of Saturn at various phase angles while it was in orbit around Saturn from 2004–2017, which allowed for the determination of rotation periods and shapes of the Saturnian irregular moons. In 2018–2019, researchers Tilmann Denk and Stefan Mottola investigated Cassini's irregular moon observations and found that Kiviuq, Erriapus, Bestla, and Bebhionn exhibited exceptionally large light curve amplitudes that may indicate contact binary shapes, or potentially binary (or subsatellite) systems. In particular, the light curve amplitude of Kiviuq is the largest of the irregular moons observed by Cassini, which makes it the most likely candidate for a contact binary or binary moon. Considering that the irregular moons have most likely undergone or were formed by disruptive collisions in the past, it is possible that the fragments of disrupted irregular moons could remain gravitationally bound in orbit around each other, forming a binary system that would eventually become a contact binary.

== See also ==
- Contact binary (star)
- Binary asteroid
- Asteroid pair
