= Selam (moon) =

Moon of asteroid 152830 Dinkinesh

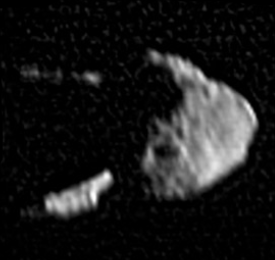
- Selam photographed by the Lucy spacecraft on 29 May 2024

Discovery
- Discovered by: Lucy
- Discovery date: 1 November 2023

Designations
- Pronunciation: /səˈlɑːm/
- Alternative names: Dinkinesh I

Orbital characteristics
- Semi-major axis: 3.11±0.05 km
- Eccentricity: ≈0
- Orbital period (sidereal): 52.67±0.04 h
- Satellite of: Dinkinesh

Physical characteristics
- Dimensions: 240 × 200 × 200 m (inner lobe); 280 × 220 × 210 m (outer lobe)
- Mean diameter: 212±21 m (inner lobe); 234±23 m (outer lobe)
- Mass: 2.8×10^{10} kg
- Synodic rotation period: 52.44±0.14 h (likely synchronous)

Selam (formal designation Dinkinesh I) is a contact binary moon of 152830 Dinkinesh, a main-belt asteroid. It was discovered by NASA's Lucy spacecraft during its flyby of Dinkinesh on 1 November 2023. The moon consists of two similarly sized lobes, each about 220 m (720 ft) in diameter.

Together, Dinkinesh and Selam form a binary asteroid system. Dinkinesh is the second binary main-belt asteroid to be explored by a spacecraft, after 243 Ida, which was visited by the Galileo spacecraft in 1993. The Dinkinesh system is similar in size and composition to the near-Earth binary asteroid system 65803 Didymos, but its greater distance from the Sun provides an opportunity to compare binary asteroids in different environments.

== Discovery ==
In the weeks before the flyby, Lucy observations showed that Dinkinesh's brightness varied differently than expected, providing the first indication that it had a companion. Images taken after the encounter revealed that Selam is a contact binary composed of two lobes joined together. Although contact binary asteroids are common in the Solar System, Selam is the first known contact binary satellite of an asteroid.

== Name ==
The moon is named after Selam, the fossilized remains of a three-year-old female Australopithecus afarensis discovered in Dikika, Ethiopia. In Amharic, Selam means "peace" (ሰላም). The name was proposed by Raphael Marschall, the scientist who first identified Dinkinesh as a potential flyby target for Lucy. The name was approved by the International Astronomical Union on 27 November 2023.

== Orbit ==
Selam orbits Dinkinesh at a semi-major axis of 3.11±0.05 km. Its orbit is nearly circular, with an eccentricity of approximately 0, and it takes 52.67±0.04 hours to complete one revolution. Selam has a synodic rotation period of 52.44±0.14 hours, suggesting that it is likely tidally locked to Dinkinesh.

== Physical characteristics ==
=== Geology ===
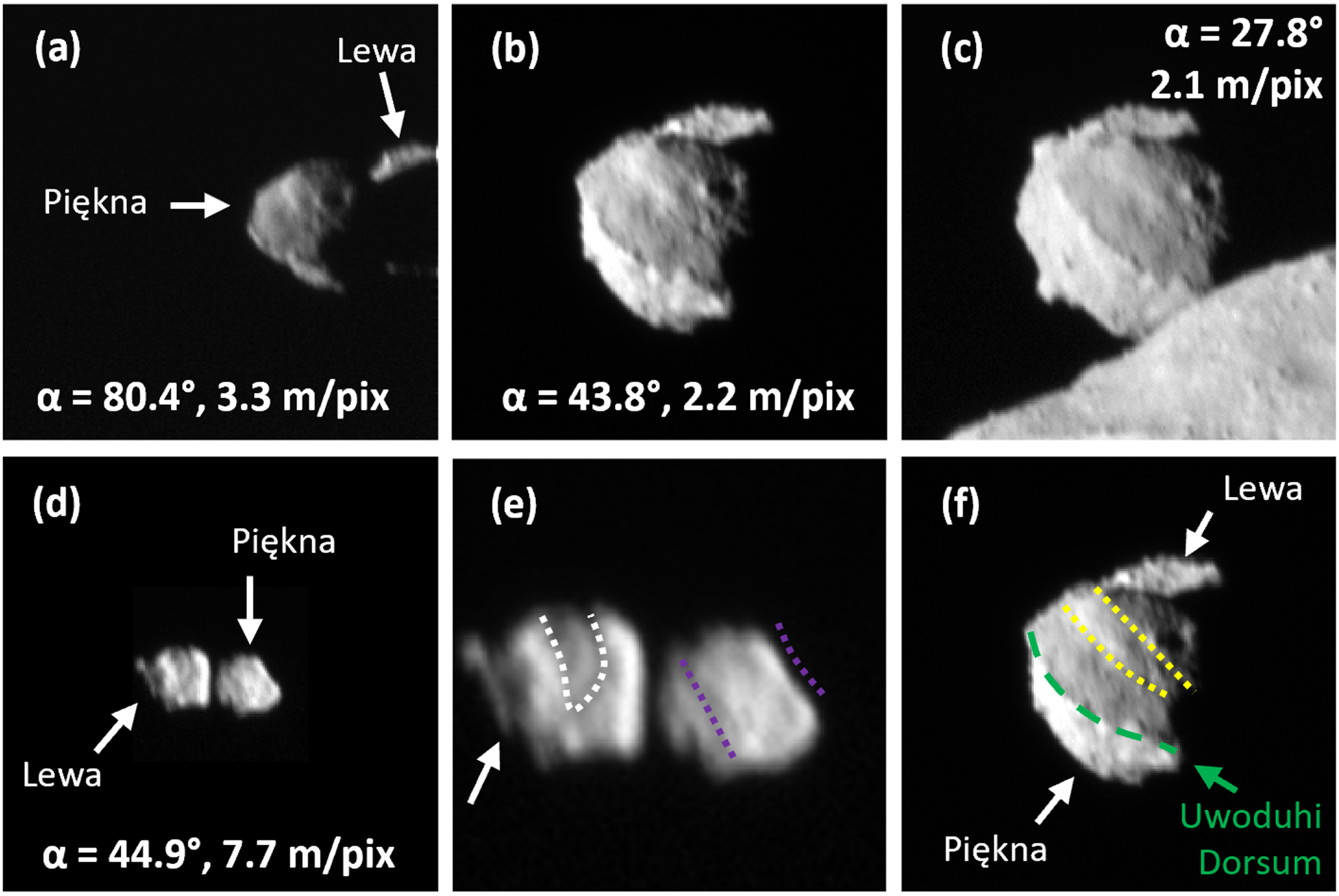
Gallery of Lucy images of Selam at different locations, phase angles (α), and pixel resolutions, with geological features labeled

Geological features on Selam are formally named after words meaning "wonderful", "marvelous", or "beautiful" in languages from around the world. This naming theme was introduced by the International Astronomical Union, which approved the first names for Selam's features on 20 December 2024.

Selam consists of two conjoined lobes of similar size. Both lobes have blocky, angular shapes with flat facets. The larger lobe, which faces away from Dinkinesh, is about 234 ± 23 m (768 ± 75 ft) in diameter and is officially named Lẹwa Lobus, after the Yoruba word for "beautiful". The smaller lobe, which faces Dinkinesh, is about 212 ± 21 m (696 ± 69 ft) in diameter and is officially named Piękna Lobus, after the Polish word for "beautiful". Piękna Lobus has a narrow ridge named Uwoduhi Dorsum, which is tilted 50 degrees relative to Selam's orbital plane and Dinkinesh's equatorial ridge. Uwoduhi Dorsum is most prominent at its narrowest point, where it is 17 m (56 ft) wide, and broadens to 38 m (125 ft) on the eastern side of Piękna Lobus. Possible explanations for the formation of Uwoduhi Dorsum include the accretion of material before Selam's two lobes merged or the formation of Piękna Lobus through a low-velocity merger between two similarly sized moonlets.

Named features on Selam
Feature	Named after	Name approved (Date · Ref)
Piękna Lobus	Polish word for "beautiful"	2024-12-20 · WGPSN
Lẹwa Lobus	Yoruba word for "beautiful"	2024-12-20 · WGPSN
Uwoduhi Dorsum	Cherokee word for "beautiful"	2024-12-20 · WGPSN

== Origin ==
Simulation of two colliding moonlets illustrating the possible formation of the Uwodohi Dorsum ridge on Selam's smaller inner lobe, Piękna Lobus

Selam is expected to have a similar origin to the satellites of rubble-pile asteroids, which are thought to form from material shed by the primary body. Mass-shedding events can occur when an asteroid rotates rapidly enough for material to accumulate along its equator and be ejected into orbit by centrifugal forces. The ejected material forms a disk around the asteroid that eventually coalesces into a satellite. The Yarkovsky–O'Keefe–Radzievskii–Paddack (YORP) effect, in which the uneven reflection of sunlight from an asteroid's surface alters its rotation, can accelerate an asteroid's rotation to the point of mass shedding. During such an event, the asteroid transfers angular momentum to the ejected material, slowing its rotation.

One possible explanation for Selam's contact-binary nature is rotational fission caused by the YORP effect. In this scenario, the fissioned material would form two separate satellites orbiting Dinkinesh, creating a triple asteroid system. Gravitational perturbations between the satellites would make the system unstable, eventually causing one satellite to collide with either Dinkinesh or the other satellite. If the collision occurred at a sufficiently low speed, less than 50 mm/s (2.0 in/s), it would not disrupt the shapes of the two bodies and could instead produce a contact binary.
