= Simone Marchi =

Italian-American astrophysicist

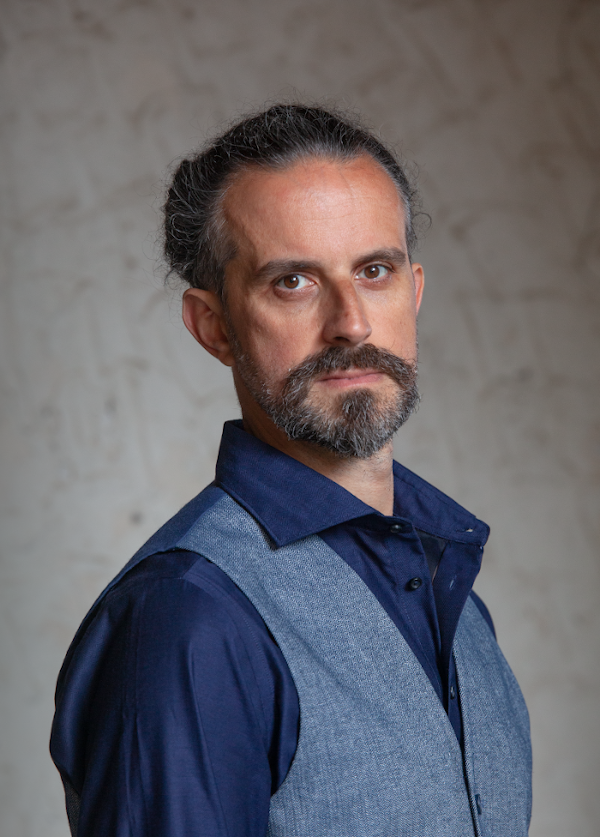
- Simone Marchi, Ph.D.
- Born: July 14, 1973 (age 53)
- Citizenship: American, Italian
- Education: Pisa University, Italy (B.S.; Ph.D.)
- Known for: Collisional studies; NASA's Lucy, Dawn missions
- Awards: Paolo Farinella Prize (2017), NASA's Susan Mahan Neibur Early Career Award (2014)
- Scientific career
- Fields: Astrophysics
- Workplaces: Southwest Research Institute

Simone Marchi (born July 14, 1973) is an Italian-American astrophysicist and Institute Scientist in the Southwest Research Institute's Solar System Science and Exploration Division in Boulder, Colorado. Marchi's main research interests are the formation and evolution of the Solar System, and in particular, asteroids and terrestrial planets.

== Career ==
Marchi received his bachelor's degree in Physics in 1998 and his Ph.D. in Applied Physics in 2003 from Pisa University, Italy.

=== Research ===
Marchi trained at the Physics and Astronomy Departments at Pisa and Padua Universities in Italy, achieving both a theoretical and observational background.Marchi was a Research Fellow from 2003 to 2010 at the Department of Astronomy, Padova University, Italy. In 2007, Marchi was a Visiting Scientist at German Aerospace Agency (DLR) in Berlin, Germany. From 2010 to 2011 he served as a Research Fellow at Université de Nice Sophia-Antipolis and Observatoire de la Côte d'Azur in Nice, France, and from 2011 to 2014 he was a NASA Fellow at Solar System Exploration Research Virtual Institute in Boulder, Colorado and Houston, Texas. Since 2014, Marchi has held various positions at the Southwest Research Institute and in 2024 was promoted to Institute Scientist.

Marchi's main research interest is studying collisional processes using numerical computations to understand the consequences of large asteroids colliding with the Earth and other rocky planets. Thanks to these studies, Marchi won the international Farinella Prize and the NASA Susan Mahan Niebur Early Career Award.

=== Space missions ===
Marchi is involved in several space missions, including: Deputy Principal Investigator for NASA's Lucy mission to visit Jupiter's Trojan asteroids; Co-Investigator of NASA's Psyche mission to rendezvous with a rare metallic asteroid; Co-Investigator of the stereo camera SIMBIOSYS for ESA's BepiColombo mission to Mercury; Co-Investigator of the camera JANUS for ESA's JUICE mission to Jupiter's Galilean Moons; Co-Investigator of NASA's Dawn mission that visited asteroids Vesta and Ceres; and Associate Scientist of the camera OSIRIS on board ESA's Rosetta spacecraft that explored comet 67P/Churyumov–Gerasimenko.

== Publications ==
Marchi is author (or co-author) of more than 200 peer-reviewed publications and has published a popular science book, Colliding Worlds: How Cosmic Encounters Shaped Planets and Life, published by Oxford University Press in 2021 and served as an Editor of the academic book Vesta and Ceres, published by the Cambridge University Press (2022).
