= List of minor planets: 467001–468000 =

The following is a partial list of minor planets, running from minor-planet number 467001 through 468000, inclusive. The primary data for this and other partial lists is based on JPL's "Small-Body Orbital Elements" and data available from the Minor Planet Center. Critical list information is also provided by the MPC, unless otherwise specified from Lowell Observatory. A detailed description of the table's columns and additional sources are given on the main page including a complete list of every page in this series, and a statistical break-up on the dynamical classification of minor planets.

Also see the summary list of all named bodies in numerical and alphabetical order, and the corresponding naming citations for the number range of this particular list. New namings may only be added to this list after official publication, as the preannouncement of names is condemned by the Working Group for Small Bodies Nomenclature of the International Astronomical Union.

Near-Earth obj.	MBA (inner)	MBA (outer)	Centaur
Mars-crosser	MBA (middle)	Jupiter trojan	Trans-Neptunian obj.
Unclassified

== 467001–467100 ==
Designation			Discovery			Properties		Ref
Permanent	Provisional	Named after	Date	Site	Discoverer(s)	Category	Diam.	Ref
467001	2016 CT_{63}	—	November 24, 2006	Kitt Peak	Spacewatch	·	1.5 km	MPC · JPL
467002	2016 CW_{66}	—	January 15, 2005	Kitt Peak	Spacewatch	EOS	2.0 km	MPC · JPL
467003	2016 CV_{72}	—	October 19, 2010	Mount Lemmon	Mount Lemmon Survey	·	1.3 km	MPC · JPL
467004	2016 CY_{72}	—	February 6, 2007	Mount Lemmon	Mount Lemmon Survey	·	1.5 km	MPC · JPL
467005	2016 CK_{81}	—	October 16, 2006	Mount Lemmon	Mount Lemmon Survey	·	780 m	MPC · JPL
467006	2016 CC_{90}	—	October 25, 2005	Kitt Peak	Spacewatch	·	1.7 km	MPC · JPL
467007	2016 CS_{103}	—	March 3, 2005	Catalina	CSS	·	4.3 km	MPC · JPL
467008	2016 CP_{107}	—	August 28, 2009	Kitt Peak	Spacewatch	·	1.7 km	MPC · JPL
467009	2016 CT_{119}	—	March 10, 2007	Mount Lemmon	Mount Lemmon Survey	·	1.8 km	MPC · JPL
467010	2016 CQ_{120}	—	October 25, 2009	Mount Lemmon	Mount Lemmon Survey	·	2.2 km	MPC · JPL
467011	2016 CX_{130}	—	September 10, 2007	Kitt Peak	Spacewatch	VER	3.2 km	MPC · JPL
467012	2016 CM_{131}	—	February 25, 2011	Mount Lemmon	Mount Lemmon Survey	·	2.0 km	MPC · JPL
467013	2016 CF_{132}	—	December 25, 2010	Mount Lemmon	Mount Lemmon Survey	·	1.4 km	MPC · JPL
467014	2016 CH_{133}	—	May 27, 2003	Kitt Peak	Spacewatch	·	2.0 km	MPC · JPL
467015	2016 CC_{143}	—	April 7, 2005	Kitt Peak	Spacewatch	·	1.3 km	MPC · JPL
467016	2016 CF_{143}	—	January 15, 2005	Anderson Mesa	LONEOS	·	2.8 km	MPC · JPL
467017	2016 CJ_{144}	—	January 19, 2005	Kitt Peak	Spacewatch	·	3.2 km	MPC · JPL
467018	2016 CM_{149}	—	January 8, 2010	Kitt Peak	Spacewatch	·	2.9 km	MPC · JPL
467019	2016 CY_{149}	—	January 8, 2007	Mount Lemmon	Mount Lemmon Survey	·	1.6 km	MPC · JPL
467020	2016 CG_{150}	—	March 9, 2005	Kitt Peak	Spacewatch	·	2.3 km	MPC · JPL
467021	2016 CJ_{150}	—	April 22, 2004	Kitt Peak	Spacewatch	·	1.3 km	MPC · JPL
467022	2016 CE_{151}	—	January 18, 2005	Kitt Peak	Spacewatch	·	2.6 km	MPC · JPL
467023	2016 CY_{166}	—	September 11, 2007	Mount Lemmon	Mount Lemmon Survey	·	720 m	MPC · JPL
467024	2016 CY_{172}	—	March 10, 2005	Mount Lemmon	Mount Lemmon Survey	NYS	1.4 km	MPC · JPL
467025	2016 CQ_{185}	—	April 20, 2012	Kitt Peak	Spacewatch	·	2.0 km	MPC · JPL
467026	2016 CX_{188}	—	September 3, 2010	Mount Lemmon	Mount Lemmon Survey	EUN	890 m	MPC · JPL
467027	2016 CZ_{188}	—	December 28, 2005	Kitt Peak	Spacewatch	·	1.4 km	MPC · JPL
467028	2016 CD_{189}	—	January 28, 2011	Mount Lemmon	Mount Lemmon Survey	·	1.9 km	MPC · JPL
467029	2016 CJ_{189}	—	April 1, 2012	Mount Lemmon	Mount Lemmon Survey	EUN	1.2 km	MPC · JPL
467030	2016 CQ_{196}	—	March 8, 2008	Kitt Peak	Spacewatch	·	1.1 km	MPC · JPL
467031	2016 CK_{198}	—	November 3, 2010	Mount Lemmon	Mount Lemmon Survey	·	1.0 km	MPC · JPL
467032	2016 CJ_{209}	—	February 1, 2005	Kitt Peak	Spacewatch	·	3.8 km	MPC · JPL
467033	2016 CO_{209}	—	April 14, 2008	Mount Lemmon	Mount Lemmon Survey	·	1.3 km	MPC · JPL
467034	2016 CS_{210}	—	March 18, 2005	Catalina	CSS	·	1.5 km	MPC · JPL
467035	2016 CB_{211}	—	August 22, 2007	Kitt Peak	Spacewatch	·	3.7 km	MPC · JPL
467036	2016 CS_{211}	—	October 16, 1996	Kitt Peak	Spacewatch	URS	3.5 km	MPC · JPL
467037	2016 CN_{213}	—	April 4, 2008	Kitt Peak	Spacewatch	·	1.1 km	MPC · JPL
467038	2016 CA_{214}	—	March 16, 2001	Kitt Peak	Spacewatch	MAS	780 m	MPC · JPL
467039	2016 CM_{214}	—	January 30, 2006	Kitt Peak	Spacewatch	·	2.2 km	MPC · JPL
467040	2016 CN_{215}	—	May 31, 2006	Kitt Peak	Spacewatch	VER	3.0 km	MPC · JPL
467041	2016 CP_{216}	—	October 1, 2005	Mount Lemmon	Mount Lemmon Survey	AEO	930 m	MPC · JPL
467042	2016 CG_{217}	—	January 23, 2006	Kitt Peak	Spacewatch	·	2.2 km	MPC · JPL
467043	2016 CF_{220}	—	April 5, 2011	Catalina	CSS	·	2.5 km	MPC · JPL
467044	2016 CA_{247}	—	December 9, 2012	Catalina	CSS	H	470 m	MPC · JPL
467045	2016 CE_{255}	—	March 8, 2005	Kitt Peak	Spacewatch	·	4.8 km	MPC · JPL
467046	2016 CM_{255}	—	January 17, 2005	Kitt Peak	Spacewatch	·	2.8 km	MPC · JPL
467047	2016 CX_{258}	—	February 25, 2011	Mount Lemmon	Mount Lemmon Survey	·	1.9 km	MPC · JPL
467048	2016 CA_{259}	—	September 28, 2003	Kitt Peak	Spacewatch	BRA	1.5 km	MPC · JPL
467049	2016 DV_{2}	—	December 16, 2007	Mount Lemmon	Mount Lemmon Survey	PHO	1.0 km	MPC · JPL
467050	2016 DR_{3}	—	February 10, 2007	Mount Lemmon	Mount Lemmon Survey	·	1.9 km	MPC · JPL
467051	2016 DY_{5}	—	July 18, 2007	Mount Lemmon	Mount Lemmon Survey	EOS	2.4 km	MPC · JPL
467052	2016 DN_{6}	—	February 16, 2007	Catalina	CSS	·	2.4 km	MPC · JPL
467053	2016 DO_{6}	—	February 10, 1999	Kitt Peak	Spacewatch	·	2.9 km	MPC · JPL
467054	2016 DP_{6}	—	February 27, 2012	Haleakala	Pan-STARRS 1	·	1.4 km	MPC · JPL
467055	2016 DT_{6}	—	January 10, 1999	Kitt Peak	Spacewatch	·	2.0 km	MPC · JPL
467056	2016 DU_{6}	—	January 29, 2009	Mount Lemmon	Mount Lemmon Survey	·	910 m	MPC · JPL
467057	2016 DJ_{8}	—	October 5, 1999	Kitt Peak	Spacewatch	·	1.4 km	MPC · JPL
467058	2016 DB_{10}	—	December 2, 2005	Kitt Peak	Spacewatch	AGN	1.2 km	MPC · JPL
467059	2016 DR_{12}	—	February 4, 2009	Mount Lemmon	Mount Lemmon Survey	·	610 m	MPC · JPL
467060	2016 DA_{13}	—	April 16, 2010	WISE	WISE	·	3.6 km	MPC · JPL
467061	2016 DJ_{13}	—	January 15, 2005	Kitt Peak	Spacewatch	EOS	1.6 km	MPC · JPL
467062	2016 DA_{15}	—	April 22, 2007	Mount Lemmon	Mount Lemmon Survey	·	2.1 km	MPC · JPL
467063	2016 DC_{15}	—	August 25, 2000	Socorro	LINEAR	·	2.0 km	MPC · JPL
467064	2016 DD_{15}	—	December 19, 2003	Kitt Peak	Spacewatch	·	1.2 km	MPC · JPL
467065	2016 DY_{15}	—	March 11, 2005	Mount Lemmon	Mount Lemmon Survey	EOS	2.4 km	MPC · JPL
467066	2016 DG_{16}	—	March 19, 2009	Catalina	CSS	·	1.1 km	MPC · JPL
467067	2016 DC_{19}	—	April 5, 2003	Kitt Peak	Spacewatch	·	1.5 km	MPC · JPL
467068	2016 DD_{19}	—	October 6, 2005	Mount Lemmon	Mount Lemmon Survey	·	1.4 km	MPC · JPL
467069	2016 DF_{19}	—	March 11, 2005	Mount Lemmon	Mount Lemmon Survey	·	1.0 km	MPC · JPL
467070	2016 DN_{19}	—	November 8, 2010	Kitt Peak	Spacewatch	(5)	1.4 km	MPC · JPL
467071	2016 DW_{19}	—	March 1, 2008	Kitt Peak	Spacewatch	·	800 m	MPC · JPL
467072	2016 DE_{20}	—	January 24, 2007	Mount Lemmon	Mount Lemmon Survey	·	1.5 km	MPC · JPL
467073	2016 DF_{20}	—	March 12, 2005	Kitt Peak	Spacewatch	·	1.2 km	MPC · JPL
467074	2016 DG_{20}	—	January 25, 2011	Kitt Peak	Spacewatch	·	2.0 km	MPC · JPL
467075	2016 DM_{20}	—	January 16, 2005	Kitt Peak	Spacewatch	·	1.0 km	MPC · JPL
467076	2016 DQ_{20}	—	October 8, 2007	Kitt Peak	Spacewatch	·	710 m	MPC · JPL
467077	2016 DM_{23}	—	March 3, 2000	Socorro	LINEAR	H	590 m	MPC · JPL
467078	2016 DQ_{23}	—	May 2, 2006	Mount Lemmon	Mount Lemmon Survey	·	3.1 km	MPC · JPL
467079	2016 DS_{26}	—	November 9, 2007	Kitt Peak	Spacewatch	·	1.3 km	MPC · JPL
467080	2016 DX_{26}	—	October 23, 2008	Mount Lemmon	Mount Lemmon Survey	THM	2.3 km	MPC · JPL
467081	2016 DD_{27}	—	December 30, 2008	Mount Lemmon	Mount Lemmon Survey	(2076)	690 m	MPC · JPL
467082	2016 DO_{27}	—	December 29, 2005	Mount Lemmon	Mount Lemmon Survey	·	670 m	MPC · JPL
467083	2016 DP_{27}	—	September 15, 2007	Kitt Peak	Spacewatch	·	800 m	MPC · JPL
467084	2016 DZ_{29}	—	November 18, 2011	Kitt Peak	Spacewatch	·	760 m	MPC · JPL
467085	2016 EB_{4}	—	September 17, 2009	Mount Lemmon	Mount Lemmon Survey	·	1.9 km	MPC · JPL
467086	2016 EZ_{4}	—	March 10, 2005	Mount Lemmon	Mount Lemmon Survey	·	2.5 km	MPC · JPL
467087	2016 EB_{5}	—	March 11, 2005	Mount Lemmon	Mount Lemmon Survey	HYG	2.3 km	MPC · JPL
467088	2016 EH_{6}	—	February 2, 2008	Catalina	CSS	H	630 m	MPC · JPL
467089	2016 EW_{7}	—	October 8, 2007	Kitt Peak	Spacewatch	·	940 m	MPC · JPL
467090	2016 EX_{7}	—	March 31, 2009	Kitt Peak	Spacewatch	·	970 m	MPC · JPL
467091	2016 EY_{7}	—	November 9, 2007	Kitt Peak	Spacewatch	·	840 m	MPC · JPL
467092	2016 EU_{9}	—	December 2, 2004	Kitt Peak	Spacewatch	·	800 m	MPC · JPL
467093	2016 ES_{10}	—	October 13, 2010	Mount Lemmon	Mount Lemmon Survey	·	1.2 km	MPC · JPL
467094	2016 EV_{11}	—	January 4, 2011	Mount Lemmon	Mount Lemmon Survey	·	1.6 km	MPC · JPL
467095	2016 EY_{14}	—	November 16, 2006	Catalina	CSS	MAR	1.2 km	MPC · JPL
467096	2016 EA_{19}	—	December 8, 2010	Kitt Peak	Spacewatch	·	1.9 km	MPC · JPL
467097	2016 ED_{22}	—	November 14, 2006	Mount Lemmon	Mount Lemmon Survey	·	1.8 km	MPC · JPL
467098	2016 EF_{22}	—	December 13, 2010	Mount Lemmon	Mount Lemmon Survey	ADE	2.2 km	MPC · JPL
467099	2016 EB_{30}	—	October 31, 2010	Mount Lemmon	Mount Lemmon Survey	·	1.5 km	MPC · JPL
467100	2016 ET_{45}	—	November 21, 2009	Mount Lemmon	Mount Lemmon Survey	·	4.4 km	MPC · JPL

== 467101–467200 ==
back to top

Designation			Discovery			Properties		Ref
Permanent	Provisional	Named after	Date	Site	Discoverer(s)	Category	Diam.	Ref
467101	2016 EZ_{53}	—	October 21, 2006	Mount Lemmon	Mount Lemmon Survey	·	2.0 km	MPC · JPL
467102	2016 EB_{56}	—	September 20, 2006	Catalina	CSS	H	620 m	MPC · JPL
467103	2016 EK_{57}	—	June 1, 2010	WISE	WISE	T_{j} (2.99)	3.3 km	MPC · JPL
467104	2016 EN_{57}	—	March 24, 1998	Kitt Peak	Spacewatch	JUN	1.1 km	MPC · JPL
467105	2016 EZ_{57}	—	October 1, 2005	Kitt Peak	Spacewatch	·	1.2 km	MPC · JPL
467106	2016 EB_{59}	—	March 13, 2007	Kitt Peak	Spacewatch	·	1.7 km	MPC · JPL
467107	2016 EA_{60}	—	March 15, 2012	Kitt Peak	Spacewatch	·	920 m	MPC · JPL
467108	2016 EF_{60}	—	February 25, 2006	Mount Lemmon	Mount Lemmon Survey	·	2.0 km	MPC · JPL
467109	2016 ET_{60}	—	February 4, 2005	Mount Lemmon	Mount Lemmon Survey	·	960 m	MPC · JPL
467110	2016 EP_{63}	—	April 23, 2010	WISE	WISE	·	3.8 km	MPC · JPL
467111	2016 EL_{64}	—	November 16, 2003	Kitt Peak	Spacewatch	·	2.9 km	MPC · JPL
467112	2016 EO_{66}	—	September 24, 2008	Mount Lemmon	Mount Lemmon Survey	EOS	3.4 km	MPC · JPL
467113	2016 EN_{67}	—	February 1, 2005	Kitt Peak	Spacewatch	·	1.1 km	MPC · JPL
467114	2016 EQ_{67}	—	February 12, 2008	Mount Lemmon	Mount Lemmon Survey	·	2.3 km	MPC · JPL
467115	2016 EK_{68}	—	February 24, 2006	Kitt Peak	Spacewatch	EOS	1.4 km	MPC · JPL
467116	2016 EG_{72}	—	October 26, 2008	Kitt Peak	Spacewatch	EOS	1.8 km	MPC · JPL
467117	2016 EW_{72}	—	March 4, 2005	Kitt Peak	Spacewatch	·	2.9 km	MPC · JPL
467118	2016 EX_{72}	—	October 21, 2006	Mount Lemmon	Mount Lemmon Survey	(5)	1.2 km	MPC · JPL
467119	2016 EC_{73}	—	January 8, 2005	Campo Imperatore	CINEOS	·	2.2 km	MPC · JPL
467120	2016 EG_{73}	—	May 21, 2004	Kitt Peak	Spacewatch	·	1.2 km	MPC · JPL
467121	2016 EL_{73}	—	November 19, 2003	Kitt Peak	Spacewatch	·	1.5 km	MPC · JPL
467122	2016 EU_{73}	—	April 10, 2000	Kitt Peak	Spacewatch	·	770 m	MPC · JPL
467123	2016 EC_{74}	—	November 24, 2006	Mount Lemmon	Mount Lemmon Survey	·	1.9 km	MPC · JPL
467124	2016 EP_{74}	—	March 25, 2006	Kitt Peak	Spacewatch	·	850 m	MPC · JPL
467125	2016 ES_{74}	—	March 9, 2005	Mount Lemmon	Mount Lemmon Survey	MAS	650 m	MPC · JPL
467126	2016 EW_{74}	—	February 27, 2009	Kitt Peak	Spacewatch	·	900 m	MPC · JPL
467127	2016 EB_{75}	—	April 8, 2006	Kitt Peak	Spacewatch	·	570 m	MPC · JPL
467128	2016 EL_{75}	—	February 6, 2003	Kitt Peak	Spacewatch	·	2.1 km	MPC · JPL
467129	2016 EP_{75}	—	January 28, 2007	Mount Lemmon	Mount Lemmon Survey	EUN	1.4 km	MPC · JPL
467130	2016 ER_{75}	—	March 8, 2005	Mount Lemmon	Mount Lemmon Survey	NYS	990 m	MPC · JPL
467131	2016 EC_{77}	—	February 9, 2005	Kitt Peak	Spacewatch	·	2.1 km	MPC · JPL
467132	2016 EE_{77}	—	February 1, 2006	Kitt Peak	Spacewatch	·	2.0 km	MPC · JPL
467133	2016 EF_{77}	—	October 28, 2005	Mount Lemmon	Mount Lemmon Survey	AEO	1.0 km	MPC · JPL
467134	2016 EY_{77}	—	March 14, 2011	Mount Lemmon	Mount Lemmon Survey	·	1.8 km	MPC · JPL
467135	2016 ED_{78}	—	February 21, 2007	Mount Lemmon	Mount Lemmon Survey	WIT	980 m	MPC · JPL
467136	2016 EK_{78}	—	January 19, 2005	Kitt Peak	Spacewatch	·	3.6 km	MPC · JPL
467137	2016 EP_{78}	—	November 6, 2005	Kitt Peak	Spacewatch	·	2.4 km	MPC · JPL
467138	2016 EB_{79}	—	May 26, 2003	Kitt Peak	Spacewatch	JUN	1.3 km	MPC · JPL
467139	2016 EG_{79}	—	April 16, 2008	Mount Lemmon	Mount Lemmon Survey	EUN	1.0 km	MPC · JPL
467140	2016 ES_{79}	—	January 7, 2010	Kitt Peak	Spacewatch	·	3.1 km	MPC · JPL
467141	2016 EV_{79}	—	September 15, 2007	Mount Lemmon	Mount Lemmon Survey	V	670 m	MPC · JPL
467142	2016 EZ_{79}	—	January 10, 2011	Mount Lemmon	Mount Lemmon Survey	WIT	1.1 km	MPC · JPL
467143	2016 EY_{80}	—	October 23, 2011	Mount Lemmon	Mount Lemmon Survey	·	600 m	MPC · JPL
467144	2016 EB_{81}	—	February 26, 2010	WISE	WISE	·	1.7 km	MPC · JPL
467145	2016 EK_{82}	—	October 16, 2009	Mount Lemmon	Mount Lemmon Survey	·	1.2 km	MPC · JPL
467146	2016 EG_{83}	—	December 1, 2008	Kitt Peak	Spacewatch	·	3.3 km	MPC · JPL
467147	2016 EJ_{83}	—	May 22, 2006	Kitt Peak	Spacewatch	·	3.3 km	MPC · JPL
467148	2016 EL_{83}	—	December 14, 2010	Mount Lemmon	Mount Lemmon Survey	·	1.7 km	MPC · JPL
467149	2016 EQ_{83}	—	March 13, 2012	Catalina	CSS	EUN	1.2 km	MPC · JPL
467150	2016 EV_{83}	—	September 23, 2008	Mount Lemmon	Mount Lemmon Survey	·	2.7 km	MPC · JPL
467151	2016 ER_{86}	—	February 7, 2002	Socorro	LINEAR	DOR	2.3 km	MPC · JPL
467152	2016 EW_{86}	—	February 13, 2010	Mount Lemmon	Mount Lemmon Survey	·	2.5 km	MPC · JPL
467153	2016 EC_{87}	—	December 28, 2011	Kitt Peak	Spacewatch	·	1.1 km	MPC · JPL
467154	2016 EB_{88}	—	March 23, 2006	Kitt Peak	Spacewatch	EOS	2.0 km	MPC · JPL
467155	2016 EE_{88}	—	September 13, 2007	Mount Lemmon	Mount Lemmon Survey	·	3.4 km	MPC · JPL
467156	2016 EV_{88}	—	December 5, 2007	Kitt Peak	Spacewatch	·	1.0 km	MPC · JPL
467157	2016 EY_{88}	—	March 11, 1996	Kitt Peak	Spacewatch	·	1.4 km	MPC · JPL
467158	2016 EB_{89}	—	April 29, 2010	WISE	WISE	·	4.0 km	MPC · JPL
467159	2016 EJ_{89}	—	January 26, 2006	Kitt Peak	Spacewatch	KOR	1.2 km	MPC · JPL
467160	2016 EK_{90}	—	February 1, 2005	Kitt Peak	Spacewatch	NYS	950 m	MPC · JPL
467161	2016 ET_{94}	—	January 28, 2007	Kitt Peak	Spacewatch	·	1.7 km	MPC · JPL
467162	2016 EC_{96}	—	January 11, 2010	Mount Lemmon	Mount Lemmon Survey	EOS	2.3 km	MPC · JPL
467163	2016 EY_{100}	—	October 1, 2008	Kitt Peak	Spacewatch	VER	3.0 km	MPC · JPL
467164	2016 EW_{104}	—	December 20, 2009	Mount Lemmon	Mount Lemmon Survey	·	2.8 km	MPC · JPL
467165	2016 ER_{106}	—	February 26, 2006	Anderson Mesa	LONEOS	·	960 m	MPC · JPL
467166	2016 ET_{107}	—	November 17, 2009	Kitt Peak	Spacewatch	·	2.1 km	MPC · JPL
467167	2016 EV_{108}	—	March 3, 2000	Socorro	LINEAR	·	2.8 km	MPC · JPL
467168	2016 EB_{109}	—	December 19, 2003	Socorro	LINEAR	·	3.4 km	MPC · JPL
467169	2016 EF_{109}	—	March 16, 2005	Catalina	CSS	·	3.4 km	MPC · JPL
467170	2016 EH_{109}	—	March 18, 2004	Kitt Peak	Spacewatch	·	1.5 km	MPC · JPL
467171	2016 EH_{110}	—	April 4, 2011	Mount Lemmon	Mount Lemmon Survey	EOS	2.1 km	MPC · JPL
467172	2016 EK_{110}	—	April 8, 2006	Kitt Peak	Spacewatch	·	3.0 km	MPC · JPL
467173	2016 ET_{110}	—	February 14, 2005	Catalina	CSS	·	2.9 km	MPC · JPL
467174	2016 EU_{110}	—	April 6, 2005	Kitt Peak	Spacewatch	PHO	1.1 km	MPC · JPL
467175	2016 EX_{110}	—	March 16, 2005	Catalina	CSS	·	3.3 km	MPC · JPL
467176	2016 EZ_{110}	—	September 10, 2007	Kitt Peak	Spacewatch	·	3.3 km	MPC · JPL
467177	2016 EC_{111}	—	March 20, 2002	Kitt Peak	Spacewatch	DOR	2.2 km	MPC · JPL
467178	2016 EH_{111}	—	February 16, 2010	Mount Lemmon	Mount Lemmon Survey	·	3.5 km	MPC · JPL
467179	2016 EQ_{111}	—	November 1, 2008	Mount Lemmon	Mount Lemmon Survey	·	540 m	MPC · JPL
467180	2016 EG_{112}	—	October 27, 2009	Mount Lemmon	Mount Lemmon Survey	·	1.9 km	MPC · JPL
467181	2016 EV_{112}	—	February 9, 2005	Kitt Peak	Spacewatch	MAS	630 m	MPC · JPL
467182	2016 EN_{113}	—	October 11, 2009	Mount Lemmon	Mount Lemmon Survey	·	2.1 km	MPC · JPL
467183	2016 EL_{115}	—	August 17, 2009	Kitt Peak	Spacewatch	·	1.9 km	MPC · JPL
467184	2016 ET_{115}	—	December 17, 2006	Catalina	CSS	·	1.8 km	MPC · JPL
467185	2016 EK_{116}	—	November 10, 1999	Kitt Peak	Spacewatch	·	1.9 km	MPC · JPL
467186	2016 EW_{116}	—	September 26, 1995	Kitt Peak	Spacewatch	·	2.9 km	MPC · JPL
467187	2016 EH_{118}	—	April 7, 2006	Kitt Peak	Spacewatch	·	2.6 km	MPC · JPL
467188	2016 EJ_{119}	—	February 9, 2005	Mount Lemmon	Mount Lemmon Survey	NYS	910 m	MPC · JPL
467189	2016 ES_{119}	—	March 26, 2009	Kitt Peak	Spacewatch	·	1.2 km	MPC · JPL
467190	2016 EA_{120}	—	January 6, 2010	Kitt Peak	Spacewatch	·	3.6 km	MPC · JPL
467191	2016 EB_{120}	—	October 6, 1999	Kitt Peak	Spacewatch	·	2.9 km	MPC · JPL
467192	2016 EO_{123}	—	October 9, 2007	Mount Lemmon	Mount Lemmon Survey	·	2.1 km	MPC · JPL
467193	2016 EQ_{125}	—	March 5, 2006	Kitt Peak	Spacewatch	·	660 m	MPC · JPL
467194	2016 EZ_{126}	—	September 30, 2005	Mount Lemmon	Mount Lemmon Survey	·	1.4 km	MPC · JPL
467195	2016 EP_{129}	—	December 1, 2005	Kitt Peak	Spacewatch	·	1.7 km	MPC · JPL
467196	2016 ED_{130}	—	October 11, 2007	Kitt Peak	Spacewatch	·	820 m	MPC · JPL
467197	2016 EE_{133}	—	September 16, 2010	Mount Lemmon	Mount Lemmon Survey	V	670 m	MPC · JPL
467198	2016 EG_{133}	—	September 23, 2001	Kitt Peak	Spacewatch	·	4.8 km	MPC · JPL
467199	2016 EU_{133}	—	March 3, 2005	Catalina	CSS	·	2.5 km	MPC · JPL
467200	2016 EJ_{134}	—	September 11, 2005	Kitt Peak	Spacewatch	·	1.2 km	MPC · JPL

== 467201–467300 ==
back to top

Designation			Discovery			Properties		Ref
Permanent	Provisional	Named after	Date	Site	Discoverer(s)	Category	Diam.	Ref
467201	2016 EU_{134}	—	March 3, 2005	Catalina	CSS	·	950 m	MPC · JPL
467202	2016 ET_{136}	—	October 22, 2008	Kitt Peak	Spacewatch	EOS	1.9 km	MPC · JPL
467203	2016 EY_{137}	—	May 2, 2008	Kitt Peak	Spacewatch	·	1.2 km	MPC · JPL
467204	2016 ER_{138}	—	December 17, 2001	Socorro	LINEAR	·	1.0 km	MPC · JPL
467205	2016 EU_{138}	—	March 24, 2006	Kitt Peak	Spacewatch	·	690 m	MPC · JPL
467206	2016 EV_{139}	—	March 10, 2005	Mount Lemmon	Mount Lemmon Survey	·	1.1 km	MPC · JPL
467207	2016 EA_{140}	—	January 20, 2009	Mount Lemmon	Mount Lemmon Survey	·	820 m	MPC · JPL
467208	2016 EF_{142}	—	February 16, 2010	Kitt Peak	Spacewatch	·	2.9 km	MPC · JPL
467209	2016 ER_{143}	—	February 13, 2008	Mount Lemmon	Mount Lemmon Survey	·	1.2 km	MPC · JPL
467210	2016 EJ_{145}	—	March 31, 2005	Anderson Mesa	LONEOS	·	4.1 km	MPC · JPL
467211	2016 EY_{145}	—	April 6, 2005	Catalina	CSS	·	1.0 km	MPC · JPL
467212	2016 EM_{146}	—	December 31, 2007	Kitt Peak	Spacewatch	·	1.4 km	MPC · JPL
467213	2016 EP_{151}	—	December 19, 2004	Mount Lemmon	Mount Lemmon Survey	·	930 m	MPC · JPL
467214	2016 EF_{154}	—	September 13, 2007	Mount Lemmon	Mount Lemmon Survey	·	3.7 km	MPC · JPL
467215	2016 EO_{154}	—	September 12, 2007	Mount Lemmon	Mount Lemmon Survey	·	560 m	MPC · JPL
467216	2016 EY_{154}	—	May 7, 2010	WISE	WISE	·	3.2 km	MPC · JPL
467217	2016 ER_{158}	—	October 5, 2005	Kitt Peak	Spacewatch	·	1.4 km	MPC · JPL
467218	2016 EQ_{159}	—	April 17, 2010	WISE	WISE	·	2.9 km	MPC · JPL
467219	2016 EL_{160}	—	September 26, 2006	Catalina	CSS	·	3.2 km	MPC · JPL
467220	2016 EL_{161}	—	September 17, 2010	Mount Lemmon	Mount Lemmon Survey	·	1.4 km	MPC · JPL
467221	2016 EH_{162}	—	April 6, 2008	Kitt Peak	Spacewatch	·	1.0 km	MPC · JPL
467222	2016 EV_{162}	—	March 24, 2006	Mount Lemmon	Mount Lemmon Survey	·	1.9 km	MPC · JPL
467223	2016 EJ_{163}	—	October 12, 2007	Kitt Peak	Spacewatch	·	1.1 km	MPC · JPL
467224	2016 ES_{163}	—	September 24, 2008	Mount Lemmon	Mount Lemmon Survey	·	2.1 km	MPC · JPL
467225	2016 EY_{163}	—	January 13, 1999	Kitt Peak	Spacewatch	·	1.6 km	MPC · JPL
467226	2016 ED_{164}	—	February 15, 2010	Mount Lemmon	Mount Lemmon Survey	·	3.1 km	MPC · JPL
467227	2016 EE_{164}	—	November 20, 2006	Kitt Peak	Spacewatch	·	1.3 km	MPC · JPL
467228	2016 EO_{164}	—	February 13, 2008	Mount Lemmon	Mount Lemmon Survey	·	1.4 km	MPC · JPL
467229	2016 EQ_{164}	—	March 4, 2005	Kitt Peak	Spacewatch	·	2.5 km	MPC · JPL
467230	2016 ET_{164}	—	March 8, 2005	Mount Lemmon	Mount Lemmon Survey	·	3.0 km	MPC · JPL
467231	2016 EY_{164}	—	February 23, 1998	Kitt Peak	Spacewatch	·	820 m	MPC · JPL
467232	2016 EA_{165}	—	September 20, 2006	Catalina	CSS	·	1.3 km	MPC · JPL
467233	2016 EC_{165}	—	December 5, 2007	Kitt Peak	Spacewatch	·	1.3 km	MPC · JPL
467234	2016 EK_{165}	—	October 29, 2014	Catalina	CSS	·	1.7 km	MPC · JPL
467235	2016 EO_{165}	—	February 26, 2012	Kitt Peak	Spacewatch	·	1.2 km	MPC · JPL
467236	2016 EB_{166}	—	September 5, 2008	Kitt Peak	Spacewatch	·	2.3 km	MPC · JPL
467237	2016 ED_{166}	—	September 10, 2010	Kitt Peak	Spacewatch	·	1.2 km	MPC · JPL
467238	2016 EE_{166}	—	October 25, 2005	Mount Lemmon	Mount Lemmon Survey	·	2.4 km	MPC · JPL
467239	2016 EH_{166}	—	February 14, 2010	Mount Lemmon	Mount Lemmon Survey	·	3.2 km	MPC · JPL
467240	2016 EW_{169}	—	March 17, 2005	Kitt Peak	Spacewatch	·	2.5 km	MPC · JPL
467241	2016 EB_{170}	—	November 7, 2010	Mount Lemmon	Mount Lemmon Survey	·	1.2 km	MPC · JPL
467242	2016 EF_{170}	—	April 14, 2005	Kitt Peak	Spacewatch	·	3.3 km	MPC · JPL
467243	2016 EQ_{170}	—	September 15, 1990	La Silla	E. W. Elst	·	2.2 km	MPC · JPL
467244	2016 ET_{170}	—	November 18, 2007	Mount Lemmon	Mount Lemmon Survey	·	840 m	MPC · JPL
467245	2016 EA_{171}	—	November 10, 2004	Kitt Peak	Spacewatch	AGN	1.4 km	MPC · JPL
467246	2016 EZ_{171}	—	March 27, 2012	Kitt Peak	Spacewatch	·	1.1 km	MPC · JPL
467247	2016 EK_{172}	—	December 30, 2005	Kitt Peak	Spacewatch	·	2.2 km	MPC · JPL
467248	2016 EM_{172}	—	February 7, 2008	Mount Lemmon	Mount Lemmon Survey	·	1.0 km	MPC · JPL
467249	2016 ER_{172}	—	March 27, 1995	Kitt Peak	Spacewatch	·	2.4 km	MPC · JPL
467250	2016 ES_{172}	—	December 20, 2004	Mount Lemmon	Mount Lemmon Survey	·	1.8 km	MPC · JPL
467251	2016 EV_{172}	—	June 20, 2006	Kitt Peak	Spacewatch	EOS	2.2 km	MPC · JPL
467252	2016 EB_{173}	—	April 13, 2002	Palomar	NEAT	·	1.1 km	MPC · JPL
467253	2016 EE_{173}	—	October 26, 2008	Mount Lemmon	Mount Lemmon Survey	·	3.8 km	MPC · JPL
467254	2016 EO_{173}	—	October 29, 2003	Kitt Peak	Spacewatch	·	3.3 km	MPC · JPL
467255	2016 EV_{173}	—	September 11, 2007	Mount Lemmon	Mount Lemmon Survey	(43176)	3.7 km	MPC · JPL
467256	2016 ER_{175}	—	March 24, 2006	Mount Lemmon	Mount Lemmon Survey	·	1.9 km	MPC · JPL
467257	2016 ET_{175}	—	February 24, 2012	Mount Lemmon	Mount Lemmon Survey	·	1.4 km	MPC · JPL
467258	2016 EV_{175}	—	February 4, 2006	Kitt Peak	Spacewatch	KOR	1.3 km	MPC · JPL
467259	2016 EA_{176}	—	January 10, 2011	Mount Lemmon	Mount Lemmon Survey	·	1.5 km	MPC · JPL
467260	2016 EQ_{177}	—	November 20, 2003	Kitt Peak	Spacewatch	·	1.1 km	MPC · JPL
467261	2016 EU_{178}	—	March 13, 2005	Mount Lemmon	Mount Lemmon Survey	·	1.2 km	MPC · JPL
467262	2016 EG_{181}	—	February 2, 2005	Kitt Peak	Spacewatch	ERI	1.7 km	MPC · JPL
467263	2016 EW_{181}	—	March 2, 2006	Kitt Peak	Spacewatch	·	820 m	MPC · JPL
467264	2016 EX_{181}	—	August 29, 2005	Kitt Peak	Spacewatch	·	1.1 km	MPC · JPL
467265	2016 EC_{182}	—	October 2, 2013	Catalina	CSS	·	2.0 km	MPC · JPL
467266	2016 EO_{184}	—	March 27, 2008	Mount Lemmon	Mount Lemmon Survey	MAR	1.1 km	MPC · JPL
467267	2016 ET_{184}	—	September 20, 2009	Mount Lemmon	Mount Lemmon Survey	TEL	1.4 km	MPC · JPL
467268	2016 EQ_{185}	—	August 19, 2003	Campo Imperatore	CINEOS	·	2.3 km	MPC · JPL
467269	2016 EO_{186}	—	September 13, 2007	Mount Lemmon	Mount Lemmon Survey	·	2.6 km	MPC · JPL
467270	2016 EU_{186}	—	October 20, 1995	Kitt Peak	Spacewatch	·	2.4 km	MPC · JPL
467271	2016 EA_{187}	—	November 19, 2003	Kitt Peak	Spacewatch	·	3.0 km	MPC · JPL
467272	2016 EQ_{188}	—	September 17, 2010	Mount Lemmon	Mount Lemmon Survey	·	1.5 km	MPC · JPL
467273	2016 EF_{189}	—	October 27, 2006	Kitt Peak	Spacewatch	·	990 m	MPC · JPL
467274	2016 EK_{189}	—	December 6, 2010	Mount Lemmon	Mount Lemmon Survey	·	1.9 km	MPC · JPL
467275	2016 EF_{190}	—	October 20, 2005	Mount Lemmon	Mount Lemmon Survey	·	1.8 km	MPC · JPL
467276	2016 EJ_{190}	—	October 17, 2003	Kitt Peak	Spacewatch	EOS	1.7 km	MPC · JPL
467277	2016 EZ_{190}	—	November 6, 2008	Mount Lemmon	Mount Lemmon Survey	·	3.8 km	MPC · JPL
467278	2016 EF_{192}	—	May 11, 2008	Kitt Peak	Spacewatch	·	1.5 km	MPC · JPL
467279	2016 EM_{192}	—	October 22, 2005	Kitt Peak	Spacewatch	·	1.2 km	MPC · JPL
467280	2016 EQ_{192}	—	November 8, 2008	Mount Lemmon	Mount Lemmon Survey	·	3.2 km	MPC · JPL
467281	2016 ES_{192}	—	March 8, 2005	Mount Lemmon	Mount Lemmon Survey	·	2.4 km	MPC · JPL
467282	2016 EG_{193}	—	March 15, 2010	Kitt Peak	Spacewatch	·	3.6 km	MPC · JPL
467283	2016 EH_{193}	—	March 3, 2000	Socorro	LINEAR	·	2.5 km	MPC · JPL
467284	2016 EP_{193}	—	February 2, 2012	Mount Lemmon	Mount Lemmon Survey	PHO	1.0 km	MPC · JPL
467285	2016 EO_{194}	—	March 9, 2005	Mount Lemmon	Mount Lemmon Survey	NYS	1.3 km	MPC · JPL
467286	2016 ER_{194}	—	February 24, 1998	Kitt Peak	Spacewatch	·	950 m	MPC · JPL
467287	2016 ET_{194}	—	November 17, 2004	Campo Imperatore	CINEOS	KOR	1.8 km	MPC · JPL
467288	2016 EY_{194}	—	September 22, 2003	Kitt Peak	Spacewatch	EOS	2.0 km	MPC · JPL
467289	2016 EG_{195}	—	March 14, 2011	Mount Lemmon	Mount Lemmon Survey	·	1.9 km	MPC · JPL
467290	2016 EK_{195}	—	May 30, 2006	Mount Lemmon	Mount Lemmon Survey	PHO	990 m	MPC · JPL
467291	2016 EM_{196}	—	October 6, 2008	Mount Lemmon	Mount Lemmon Survey	·	3.0 km	MPC · JPL
467292	2016 EN_{196}	—	December 19, 2007	Mount Lemmon	Mount Lemmon Survey	V	800 m	MPC · JPL
467293	2016 EP_{196}	—	September 29, 2005	Kitt Peak	Spacewatch	·	2.3 km	MPC · JPL
467294	2016 EW_{196}	—	April 15, 2010	WISE	WISE	·	4.1 km	MPC · JPL
467295	2016 EC_{198}	—	November 18, 2006	Mount Lemmon	Mount Lemmon Survey	·	1.0 km	MPC · JPL
467296	2016 ED_{198}	—	February 3, 2009	Kitt Peak	Spacewatch	·	630 m	MPC · JPL
467297	2016 EE_{198}	—	April 6, 2005	Kitt Peak	Spacewatch	HYG	3.5 km	MPC · JPL
467298	2016 EJ_{198}	—	February 7, 2002	Kitt Peak	Spacewatch	NEM	2.5 km	MPC · JPL
467299	2016 EY_{198}	—	December 24, 2006	Kitt Peak	Spacewatch	·	1.2 km	MPC · JPL
467300	2016 EZ_{198}	—	March 19, 2001	Kitt Peak	Spacewatch	·	1.1 km	MPC · JPL

== 467301–467400 ==
back to top

Designation			Discovery			Properties		Ref
Permanent	Provisional	Named after	Date	Site	Discoverer(s)	Category	Diam.	Ref
467301	2016 EO_{199}	—	April 11, 2003	Kitt Peak	Spacewatch	·	1.8 km	MPC · JPL
467302	2016 EP_{199}	—	October 18, 2009	Mount Lemmon	Mount Lemmon Survey	·	1.7 km	MPC · JPL
467303	2016 EZ_{199}	—	September 25, 2005	Kitt Peak	Spacewatch	·	1.4 km	MPC · JPL
467304	2016 EB_{200}	—	January 6, 2010	Kitt Peak	Spacewatch	·	2.4 km	MPC · JPL
467305	2016 EM_{200}	—	September 30, 2006	Mount Lemmon	Mount Lemmon Survey	·	1.4 km	MPC · JPL
467306	2016 FJ_{1}	—	December 26, 2005	Mount Lemmon	Mount Lemmon Survey	·	2.0 km	MPC · JPL
467307	2016 FX_{1}	—	December 22, 2004	Catalina	CSS	·	1.1 km	MPC · JPL
467308	2016 FF_{2}	—	April 4, 2005	Mount Lemmon	Mount Lemmon Survey	·	940 m	MPC · JPL
467309	1996 AW_{1}	—	January 14, 1996	Kitt Peak	Spacewatch	APO · PHA	370 m	MPC · JPL
467310	1996 RX_{17}	—	September 14, 1996	Kitt Peak	Spacewatch	·	710 m	MPC · JPL
467311	1998 TR_{36}	—	October 13, 1998	Kitt Peak	Spacewatch	·	1.2 km	MPC · JPL
467312	1998 WF_{38}	—	November 15, 1998	Kitt Peak	Spacewatch	·	560 m	MPC · JPL
467313	1999 AS_{34}	—	January 15, 1999	Kitt Peak	Spacewatch	·	540 m	MPC · JPL
467314	1999 CY_{129}	—	February 6, 1999	Mauna Kea	Veillet, C.	·	2.3 km	MPC · JPL
467315	1999 TZ_{244}	—	October 7, 1999	Catalina	CSS	·	1.8 km	MPC · JPL
467316	1999 UX_{21}	—	October 31, 1999	Kitt Peak	Spacewatch	NYS	780 m	MPC · JPL
467317	2000 QW_{7}	—	August 26, 2000	Haleakala	NEAT	AMO · PHA	390 m	MPC · JPL
467318	2000 SC_{29}	—	September 24, 2000	Socorro	LINEAR	·	4.1 km	MPC · JPL
467319	2000 UZ_{112}	—	October 30, 2000	Socorro	LINEAR	·	2.2 km	MPC · JPL
467320	2001 HV_{38}	—	April 26, 2001	Kitt Peak	Spacewatch	·	2.0 km	MPC · JPL
467321	2001 PW_{7}	—	August 10, 2001	Palomar	NEAT	·	3.0 km	MPC · JPL
467322	2001 PZ_{16}	—	August 9, 2001	Palomar	NEAT	H	550 m	MPC · JPL
467323	2001 RW_{153}	—	September 10, 2001	Anderson Mesa	LONEOS	·	1.8 km	MPC · JPL
467324	2001 SO_{306}	—	September 20, 2001	Socorro	LINEAR	·	1.1 km	MPC · JPL
467325	2001 TQ_{252}	—	October 14, 2001	Apache Point	SDSS	·	800 m	MPC · JPL
467326	2001 UQ_{58}	—	October 17, 2001	Socorro	LINEAR	·	2.0 km	MPC · JPL
467327	2001 UP_{81}	—	October 20, 2001	Socorro	LINEAR	H	500 m	MPC · JPL
467328	2001 US_{106}	—	October 20, 2001	Socorro	LINEAR	RAF	770 m	MPC · JPL
467329	2001 UT_{111}	—	September 20, 2001	Socorro	LINEAR	·	2.5 km	MPC · JPL
467330	2001 UR_{177}	—	October 21, 2001	Socorro	LINEAR	PHO	860 m	MPC · JPL
467331	2001 XR_{134}	—	November 21, 2001	Socorro	LINEAR	·	1.8 km	MPC · JPL
467332	2001 YG_{81}	—	December 18, 2001	Socorro	LINEAR	T_{j} (2.96)	4.1 km	MPC · JPL
467333	2002 CR_{280}	—	January 22, 2002	Kitt Peak	Spacewatch	·	1.3 km	MPC · JPL
467334	2002 EY_{46}	—	February 8, 2002	Socorro	LINEAR	·	850 m	MPC · JPL
467335	2002 JA_{9}	—	May 5, 2002	Palomar	NEAT	AMO	530 m	MPC · JPL
467336	2002 LT_{38}	—	June 12, 2002	Socorro	LINEAR	ATE · PHA	270 m	MPC · JPL
467337	2002 PJ_{76}	—	August 9, 2002	Haleakala	NEAT	·	940 m	MPC · JPL
467338	2002 PF_{193}	—	August 8, 2002	Palomar	NEAT	MAS	540 m	MPC · JPL
467339	2002 QZ_{107}	—	August 17, 2002	Palomar	NEAT	NYS	710 m	MPC · JPL
467340	2002 SX_{26}	—	September 29, 2002	Haleakala	NEAT	T_{j} (2.98) · 3:2	3.8 km	MPC · JPL
467341	2002 TN_{34}	—	October 2, 2002	Socorro	LINEAR	3:2 · SHU	6.1 km	MPC · JPL
467342	2002 TK_{348}	—	October 5, 2002	Apache Point	SDSS	·	2.3 km	MPC · JPL
467343	2002 TT_{364}	—	October 10, 2002	Apache Point	SDSS	EOS	1.8 km	MPC · JPL
467344	2002 US_{43}	—	October 30, 2002	Kitt Peak	Spacewatch	T_{j} (2.96)	4.1 km	MPC · JPL
467345	2002 WD_{27}	—	November 16, 2002	Palomar	NEAT	·	1.2 km	MPC · JPL
467346	2003 CB_{5}	—	January 10, 2003	Socorro	LINEAR	·	3.5 km	MPC · JPL
467347	2003 GR	—	April 3, 2003	Anderson Mesa	LONEOS	APO	260 m	MPC · JPL
467348	2003 GY_{43}	—	April 9, 2003	Socorro	LINEAR	·	2.0 km	MPC · JPL
467349	2003 HR_{52}	—	April 11, 2003	Kitt Peak	Spacewatch	·	1.9 km	MPC · JPL
467350	2003 JD_{4}	—	May 1, 2003	Kitt Peak	Spacewatch	JUN	830 m	MPC · JPL
467351	2003 KO_{2}	—	May 22, 2003	Socorro	LINEAR	ATE · PHA	300 m	MPC · JPL
467352	2003 KZ_{18}	—	May 31, 2003	Socorro	LINEAR	ATE	470 m	MPC · JPL
467353	2003 NN_{7}	—	June 28, 2003	Socorro	LINEAR	·	2.1 km	MPC · JPL
467354	2003 NB_{13}	—	July 7, 2003	Kitt Peak	Spacewatch	·	730 m	MPC · JPL
467355	2003 OF_{16}	—	July 24, 2003	Wise	Wise	·	2.9 km	MPC · JPL
467356	2003 QJ_{9}	—	August 20, 2003	Campo Imperatore	CINEOS	DOR	2.2 km	MPC · JPL
467357	2003 QE_{115}	—	August 26, 2003	Socorro	LINEAR	·	1.8 km	MPC · JPL
467358	2003 ST_{128}	—	September 20, 2003	Kitt Peak	Spacewatch	·	710 m	MPC · JPL
467359	2003 SO_{181}	—	September 20, 2003	Kitt Peak	Spacewatch	·	980 m	MPC · JPL
467360	2003 SJ_{184}	—	September 21, 2003	Kitt Peak	Spacewatch	·	630 m	MPC · JPL
467361	2003 SH_{187}	—	August 31, 2003	Kitt Peak	Spacewatch	·	590 m	MPC · JPL
467362	2003 SB_{232}	—	August 26, 2003	Socorro	LINEAR	·	710 m	MPC · JPL
467363	2003 UJ_{23}	—	October 22, 2003	Socorro	LINEAR	·	1.7 km	MPC · JPL
467364	2003 UZ_{277}	—	October 25, 2003	Socorro	LINEAR	·	930 m	MPC · JPL
467365	2003 WB_{26}	—	November 20, 2003	Socorro	LINEAR	·	1.6 km	MPC · JPL
467366	2003 WA_{103}	—	October 29, 2003	Socorro	LINEAR	·	2.1 km	MPC · JPL
467367	2003 YW_{42}	—	December 19, 2003	Kitt Peak	Spacewatch	·	2.3 km	MPC · JPL
467368	2004 CD_{30}	—	January 30, 2004	Kitt Peak	Spacewatch	·	2.8 km	MPC · JPL
467369	2004 DT_{63}	—	February 12, 2004	Kitt Peak	Spacewatch	·	2.7 km	MPC · JPL
467370	2004 EZ_{18}	—	March 14, 2004	Socorro	LINEAR	·	3.7 km	MPC · JPL
467371	2004 KU_{12}	—	April 30, 2004	Kitt Peak	Spacewatch	·	1.6 km	MPC · JPL
467372	2004 LG	—	June 9, 2004	Socorro	LINEAR	T_{j} (2.7) · APO +1km	870 m	MPC · JPL
467373	2004 QX_{24}	—	August 24, 2004	Siding Spring	SSS	T_{j} (2.99)	3.6 km	MPC · JPL
467374	2004 QH_{28}	—	August 25, 2004	Kitt Peak	Spacewatch	·	1.4 km	MPC · JPL
467375	2004 RA_{66}	—	August 26, 2004	Catalina	CSS	·	1.4 km	MPC · JPL
467376	2004 RX_{79}	—	July 20, 2004	Siding Spring	SSS	·	2.0 km	MPC · JPL
467377	2004 RQ_{83}	—	September 9, 2004	Socorro	LINEAR	·	780 m	MPC · JPL
467378	2004 RP_{338}	—	September 15, 2004	Kitt Peak	Spacewatch	·	620 m	MPC · JPL
467379	2004 SH	—	September 16, 2004	Socorro	LINEAR	H	590 m	MPC · JPL
467380	2004 TW_{126}	—	October 7, 2004	Socorro	LINEAR	·	1.7 km	MPC · JPL
467381	2004 TM_{137}	—	October 8, 2004	Anderson Mesa	LONEOS	·	1.6 km	MPC · JPL
467382	2004 TA_{161}	—	October 6, 2004	Kitt Peak	Spacewatch	·	700 m	MPC · JPL
467383	2004 TH_{177}	—	October 4, 2004	Kitt Peak	Spacewatch	·	710 m	MPC · JPL
467384	2004 TO_{184}	—	October 7, 2004	Kitt Peak	Spacewatch	·	1.5 km	MPC · JPL
467385	2004 TQ_{296}	—	October 10, 2004	Kitt Peak	Spacewatch	·	1.7 km	MPC · JPL
467386	2004 TY_{343}	—	October 14, 2004	Kitt Peak	Spacewatch	·	1.6 km	MPC · JPL
467387	2004 VK_{37}	—	November 4, 2004	Kitt Peak	Spacewatch	JUN	930 m	MPC · JPL
467388	2004 XC_{11}	—	December 3, 2004	Kitt Peak	Spacewatch	H	550 m	MPC · JPL
467389	2004 XX_{74}	—	November 4, 2004	Catalina	CSS	·	2.3 km	MPC · JPL
467390	2004 XP_{131}	—	December 11, 2004	Socorro	LINEAR	·	2.0 km	MPC · JPL
467391	2005 AE_{58}	—	December 14, 2004	Campo Imperatore	CINEOS	PHO	2.4 km	MPC · JPL
467392	2005 CL_{30}	—	February 1, 2005	Kitt Peak	Spacewatch	H	460 m	MPC · JPL
467393	2005 CA_{41}	—	January 15, 2005	Kitt Peak	Spacewatch	·	740 m	MPC · JPL
467394	2005 EH_{89}	—	March 8, 2005	Kitt Peak	Spacewatch	·	790 m	MPC · JPL
467395	2005 EQ_{138}	—	March 9, 2005	Socorro	LINEAR	·	2.3 km	MPC · JPL
467396	2005 GJ_{19}	—	March 17, 2005	Kitt Peak	Spacewatch	·	1.1 km	MPC · JPL
467397	2005 GD_{52}	—	April 2, 2005	Mount Lemmon	Mount Lemmon Survey	·	2.1 km	MPC · JPL
467398	2005 GH_{66}	—	April 2, 2005	Catalina	CSS	·	3.1 km	MPC · JPL
467399	2005 GR_{72}	—	April 4, 2005	Mount Lemmon	Mount Lemmon Survey	·	2.8 km	MPC · JPL
467400	2005 GW_{124}	—	March 17, 2005	Kitt Peak	Spacewatch	·	1.1 km	MPC · JPL

== 467401–467500 ==
back to top

Designation			Discovery			Properties		Ref
Permanent	Provisional	Named after	Date	Site	Discoverer(s)	Category	Diam.	Ref
467401	2005 GH_{133}	—	March 14, 2005	Mount Lemmon	Mount Lemmon Survey	LIX	2.5 km	MPC · JPL
467402	2005 GE_{205}	—	April 11, 2005	Kitt Peak	M. W. Buie	·	2.7 km	MPC · JPL
467403	2005 GZ_{222}	—	March 14, 2005	Mount Lemmon	Mount Lemmon Survey	·	2.7 km	MPC · JPL
467404	2005 JY_{26}	—	May 3, 2005	Kitt Peak	Spacewatch	·	3.6 km	MPC · JPL
467405	2005 JD_{34}	—	May 4, 2005	Kitt Peak	Spacewatch	·	4.2 km	MPC · JPL
467406	2005 JC_{109}	—	May 9, 2005	Anderson Mesa	LONEOS	PHO	1.2 km	MPC · JPL
467407	2005 JZ_{150}	—	May 3, 2005	Kitt Peak	Spacewatch	·	2.5 km	MPC · JPL
467408	2005 JW_{165}	—	May 11, 2005	Kitt Peak	Spacewatch	·	980 m	MPC · JPL
467409	2005 JW_{167}	—	May 13, 2005	Kitt Peak	Spacewatch	·	2.8 km	MPC · JPL
467410	2005 KE_{11}	—	May 30, 2005	Catalina	CSS	·	2.9 km	MPC · JPL
467411	2005 LB_{20}	—	June 11, 2005	Mayhill	Lowe, A.	PHO	1.1 km	MPC · JPL
467412	2005 MJ_{30}	—	June 29, 2005	Kitt Peak	Spacewatch	·	1.2 km	MPC · JPL
467413	2005 NX_{15}	—	July 2, 2005	Kitt Peak	Spacewatch	·	1.1 km	MPC · JPL
467414	2005 NL_{34}	—	July 5, 2005	Kitt Peak	Spacewatch	·	1.1 km	MPC · JPL
467415	2005 SG_{120}	—	September 29, 2005	Kitt Peak	Spacewatch	MAR	740 m	MPC · JPL
467416	2005 SQ_{174}	—	September 29, 2005	Kitt Peak	Spacewatch	·	1.3 km	MPC · JPL
467417	2005 TG_{6}	—	October 1, 2005	Catalina	CSS	·	1.6 km	MPC · JPL
467418	2005 UY_{118}	—	October 24, 2005	Kitt Peak	Spacewatch	·	940 m	MPC · JPL
467419	2005 UQ_{121}	—	October 24, 2005	Kitt Peak	Spacewatch	·	1.2 km	MPC · JPL
467420	2005 UC_{166}	—	October 24, 2005	Kitt Peak	Spacewatch	·	1.1 km	MPC · JPL
467421	2005 UE_{176}	—	October 24, 2005	Kitt Peak	Spacewatch	·	1.4 km	MPC · JPL
467422	2005 UL_{189}	—	October 27, 2005	Mount Lemmon	Mount Lemmon Survey	·	1.2 km	MPC · JPL
467423	2005 UN_{200}	—	October 25, 2005	Kitt Peak	Spacewatch	·	1.4 km	MPC · JPL
467424	2005 UV_{285}	—	October 26, 2005	Kitt Peak	Spacewatch	·	1.2 km	MPC · JPL
467425	2005 VN_{61}	—	November 5, 2005	Catalina	CSS	·	1.8 km	MPC · JPL
467426	2005 VA_{85}	—	October 28, 2005	Mount Lemmon	Mount Lemmon Survey	·	1.0 km	MPC · JPL
467427	2005 VG_{91}	—	November 6, 2005	Kitt Peak	Spacewatch	·	2.1 km	MPC · JPL
467428	2005 XG_{40}	—	December 5, 2005	Mount Lemmon	Mount Lemmon Survey	·	1.5 km	MPC · JPL
467429	2005 XT_{58}	—	December 2, 2005	Mount Lemmon	Mount Lemmon Survey	·	1.4 km	MPC · JPL
467430	2005 XT_{74}	—	December 6, 2005	Kitt Peak	Spacewatch	·	2.1 km	MPC · JPL
467431	2005 YO_{50}	—	December 25, 2005	Kitt Peak	Spacewatch	·	1.7 km	MPC · JPL
467432	2005 YL_{129}	—	November 28, 2005	Mount Lemmon	Mount Lemmon Survey	·	940 m	MPC · JPL
467433	2005 YP_{130}	—	December 25, 2005	Kitt Peak	Spacewatch	EUN	960 m	MPC · JPL
467434	2005 YD_{135}	—	December 26, 2005	Kitt Peak	Spacewatch	·	1.7 km	MPC · JPL
467435	2005 YM_{166}	—	December 27, 2005	Kitt Peak	Spacewatch	·	1.8 km	MPC · JPL
467436	2005 YJ_{187}	—	December 28, 2005	Kitt Peak	Spacewatch	·	1.5 km	MPC · JPL
467437	2005 YA_{197}	—	November 30, 2005	Mount Lemmon	Mount Lemmon Survey	DOR	1.6 km	MPC · JPL
467438	2005 YQ_{287}	—	December 28, 2005	Catalina	CSS	·	2.3 km	MPC · JPL
467439	2006 AV_{17}	—	January 5, 2006	Kitt Peak	Spacewatch	GEF	1.1 km	MPC · JPL
467440	2006 AV_{51}	—	January 5, 2006	Kitt Peak	Spacewatch	·	1.5 km	MPC · JPL
467441	2006 AV_{54}	—	January 5, 2006	Kitt Peak	Spacewatch	·	1.5 km	MPC · JPL
467442	2006 AB_{62}	—	December 28, 2005	Kitt Peak	Spacewatch	·	1.6 km	MPC · JPL
467443	2006 AE_{72}	—	January 6, 2006	Mount Lemmon	Mount Lemmon Survey	·	2.3 km	MPC · JPL
467444	2006 BM_{6}	—	January 7, 2006	Anderson Mesa	LONEOS	H	430 m	MPC · JPL
467445	2006 BQ_{36}	—	January 23, 2006	Kitt Peak	Spacewatch	·	730 m	MPC · JPL
467446	2006 BT_{70}	—	January 23, 2006	Kitt Peak	Spacewatch	·	1.9 km	MPC · JPL
467447	2006 BB_{78}	—	January 23, 2006	Mount Lemmon	Mount Lemmon Survey	·	1.6 km	MPC · JPL
467448	2006 BF_{127}	—	January 26, 2006	Kitt Peak	Spacewatch	·	2.0 km	MPC · JPL
467449	2006 BD_{130}	—	January 26, 2006	Kitt Peak	Spacewatch	·	1.8 km	MPC · JPL
467450	2006 BD_{202}	—	January 31, 2006	Kitt Peak	Spacewatch	AGN	1.3 km	MPC · JPL
467451	2006 CK_{14}	—	February 1, 2006	Kitt Peak	Spacewatch	DOR	2.2 km	MPC · JPL
467452	2006 DK_{92}	—	February 24, 2006	Kitt Peak	Spacewatch	·	570 m	MPC · JPL
467453	2006 DY_{113}	—	February 27, 2006	Kitt Peak	Spacewatch	·	640 m	MPC · JPL
467454	2006 DW_{216}	—	February 20, 2006	Kitt Peak	Spacewatch	AST	1.4 km	MPC · JPL
467455	2006 FC_{41}	—	March 26, 2006	Mount Lemmon	Mount Lemmon Survey	·	1.4 km	MPC · JPL
467456	2006 HC_{21}	—	April 20, 2006	Kitt Peak	Spacewatch	·	460 m	MPC · JPL
467457	2006 HX_{83}	—	April 26, 2006	Kitt Peak	Spacewatch	·	700 m	MPC · JPL
467458	2006 HB_{103}	—	April 30, 2006	Kitt Peak	Spacewatch	·	520 m	MPC · JPL
467459	2006 JQ_{21}	—	May 2, 2006	Kitt Peak	Spacewatch	·	700 m	MPC · JPL
467460	2006 JF_{42}	—	May 11, 2006	Catalina	CSS	ATE · PHA	550 m	MPC · JPL
467461	2006 KB_{11}	—	May 19, 2006	Mount Lemmon	Mount Lemmon Survey	·	4.3 km	MPC · JPL
467462	2006 KK_{13}	—	May 20, 2006	Kitt Peak	Spacewatch	·	500 m	MPC · JPL
467463	2006 KB_{54}	—	May 21, 2006	Kitt Peak	Spacewatch	·	520 m	MPC · JPL
467464	2006 KF_{60}	—	May 22, 2006	Kitt Peak	Spacewatch	·	1.5 km	MPC · JPL
467465	2006 KR_{76}	—	May 6, 2006	Mount Lemmon	Mount Lemmon Survey	·	700 m	MPC · JPL
467466	2006 KC_{92}	—	May 4, 2006	Kitt Peak	Spacewatch	NAE	2.1 km	MPC · JPL
467467	2006 KG_{94}	—	May 7, 2006	Mount Lemmon	Mount Lemmon Survey	·	1.6 km	MPC · JPL
467468	2006 PM_{16}	—	August 15, 2006	Palomar	NEAT	·	2.8 km	MPC · JPL
467469	2006 PP_{28}	—	July 28, 2006	Siding Spring	SSS	·	1.1 km	MPC · JPL
467470	2006 QQ_{12}	—	August 16, 2006	Siding Spring	SSS	·	1.1 km	MPC · JPL
467471	2006 QN_{113}	—	August 24, 2006	Palomar	NEAT	·	610 m	MPC · JPL
467472	2006 QQ_{117}	—	August 28, 2006	Catalina	CSS	NYS	1.0 km	MPC · JPL
467473	2006 QY_{185}	—	August 27, 2006	Kitt Peak	Spacewatch	V	660 m	MPC · JPL
467474	2006 RK_{5}	—	August 29, 2006	Anderson Mesa	LONEOS	·	3.4 km	MPC · JPL
467475	2006 RG_{7}	—	September 15, 2006	Socorro	LINEAR	AMO	620 m	MPC · JPL
467476	2006 RK_{30}	—	September 15, 2006	Kitt Peak	Spacewatch	VER	2.2 km	MPC · JPL
467477	2006 SJ_{28}	—	August 19, 2006	Kitt Peak	Spacewatch	·	730 m	MPC · JPL
467478	2006 SU_{124}	—	August 21, 2006	Kitt Peak	Spacewatch	·	630 m	MPC · JPL
467479	2006 SS_{135}	—	September 20, 2006	Catalina	CSS	·	4.2 km	MPC · JPL
467480	2006 SJ_{150}	—	September 19, 2006	Kitt Peak	Spacewatch	NYS	800 m	MPC · JPL
467481	2006 SD_{151}	—	September 19, 2006	Kitt Peak	Spacewatch	·	2.1 km	MPC · JPL
467482	2006 SB_{186}	—	September 25, 2006	Mount Lemmon	Mount Lemmon Survey	·	1.1 km	MPC · JPL
467483	2006 SE_{321}	—	September 27, 2006	Kitt Peak	Spacewatch	·	1.1 km	MPC · JPL
467484	2006 SJ_{321}	—	September 17, 2006	Kitt Peak	Spacewatch	NYS	850 m	MPC · JPL
467485	2006 SL_{325}	—	September 27, 2006	Kitt Peak	Spacewatch	·	2.7 km	MPC · JPL
467486	2006 SS_{356}	—	September 30, 2006	Catalina	CSS	·	1.4 km	MPC · JPL
467487	2006 SS_{366}	—	September 16, 2006	Catalina	CSS	·	3.2 km	MPC · JPL
467488	2006 TR_{48}	—	October 12, 2006	Kitt Peak	Spacewatch	·	860 m	MPC · JPL
467489	2006 TG_{86}	—	October 13, 2006	Kitt Peak	Spacewatch	ERI	1.7 km	MPC · JPL
467490	2006 TY_{97}	—	October 13, 2006	Kitt Peak	Spacewatch	·	2.8 km	MPC · JPL
467491	2006 UW_{63}	—	October 23, 2006	Eskridge	Farpoint	·	830 m	MPC · JPL
467492	2006 UR_{64}	—	September 18, 2006	Kitt Peak	Spacewatch	·	690 m	MPC · JPL
467493	2006 UV_{82}	—	October 2, 2006	Mount Lemmon	Mount Lemmon Survey	·	790 m	MPC · JPL
467494	2006 UF_{97}	—	October 2, 2006	Mount Lemmon	Mount Lemmon Survey	·	1.1 km	MPC · JPL
467495	2006 UZ_{156}	—	September 18, 2006	Kitt Peak	Spacewatch	·	1.1 km	MPC · JPL
467496	2006 VM_{63}	—	September 27, 2006	Mount Lemmon	Mount Lemmon Survey	·	900 m	MPC · JPL
467497	2006 VW_{122}	—	October 20, 2006	Mount Lemmon	Mount Lemmon Survey	·	880 m	MPC · JPL
467498	2006 WM_{103}	—	November 19, 2006	Kitt Peak	Spacewatch	·	1.0 km	MPC · JPL
467499	2006 WR_{167}	—	October 21, 2006	Mount Lemmon	Mount Lemmon Survey	·	1.1 km	MPC · JPL
467500	2006 WU_{199}	—	November 16, 2006	Mount Lemmon	Mount Lemmon Survey	·	4.5 km	MPC · JPL

== 467501–467600 ==
back to top

Designation			Discovery			Properties		Ref
Permanent	Provisional	Named after	Date	Site	Discoverer(s)	Category	Diam.	Ref
467501	2006 XH_{34}	—	December 11, 2006	Kitt Peak	Spacewatch	·	1.5 km	MPC · JPL
467502	2007 BS_{15}	—	January 17, 2007	Kitt Peak	Spacewatch	·	1.2 km	MPC · JPL
467503	2007 BO_{38}	—	January 24, 2007	Catalina	CSS	·	1.1 km	MPC · JPL
467504	2007 BK_{43}	—	January 24, 2007	Mount Lemmon	Mount Lemmon Survey	·	1.0 km	MPC · JPL
467505	2007 BM_{100}	—	January 17, 2007	Kitt Peak	Spacewatch	·	1.1 km	MPC · JPL
467506	2007 CD_{4}	—	January 28, 2007	Kitt Peak	Spacewatch	·	1.7 km	MPC · JPL
467507	2007 CT_{28}	—	November 15, 2006	Mount Lemmon	Mount Lemmon Survey	·	1.1 km	MPC · JPL
467508	2007 CK_{49}	—	February 10, 2007	Mount Lemmon	Mount Lemmon Survey	·	1.3 km	MPC · JPL
467509	2007 CW_{50}	—	February 13, 2007	Črni Vrh	J. Skvarč, H. Mikuž	·	1.8 km	MPC · JPL
467510	2007 DZ_{14}	—	February 17, 2007	Kitt Peak	Spacewatch	·	1.5 km	MPC · JPL
467511	2007 DP_{51}	—	February 17, 2007	Kitt Peak	Spacewatch	·	1.6 km	MPC · JPL
467512	2007 EN_{66}	—	March 10, 2007	Kitt Peak	Spacewatch	·	2.3 km	MPC · JPL
467513	2007 ES_{150}	—	August 7, 2004	Campo Imperatore	CINEOS	MAR	970 m	MPC · JPL
467514	2007 ET_{153}	—	March 12, 2007	Mount Lemmon	Mount Lemmon Survey	·	1.1 km	MPC · JPL
467515	2007 EE_{159}	—	March 14, 2007	Kitt Peak	Spacewatch	·	1.3 km	MPC · JPL
467516	2007 EM_{217}	—	March 11, 2007	Mount Lemmon	Mount Lemmon Survey	·	1.4 km	MPC · JPL
467517	2007 FQ_{12}	—	March 13, 2007	Catalina	CSS	·	1.5 km	MPC · JPL
467518	2007 GC_{2}	—	April 10, 2007	Altschwendt	W. Ries	·	1.9 km	MPC · JPL
467519	2007 GK_{3}	—	March 14, 2007	Kitt Peak	Spacewatch	·	1.8 km	MPC · JPL
467520	2007 GA_{10}	—	March 12, 2007	Catalina	CSS	·	2.7 km	MPC · JPL
467521	2007 GV_{17}	—	April 11, 2007	Kitt Peak	Spacewatch	·	2.0 km	MPC · JPL
467522	2007 GL_{32}	—	March 16, 2007	Mount Lemmon	Mount Lemmon Survey	NEM	2.0 km	MPC · JPL
467523	2007 GT_{61}	—	March 11, 2007	Kitt Peak	Spacewatch	·	1.7 km	MPC · JPL
467524	2007 HY_{83}	—	April 25, 2007	Kitt Peak	Spacewatch	·	2.2 km	MPC · JPL
467525	2007 HL_{97}	—	March 11, 2007	Mount Lemmon	Mount Lemmon Survey	·	1.8 km	MPC · JPL
467526	2007 KB_{3}	—	May 19, 2007	Catalina	CSS	·	3.4 km	MPC · JPL
467527	2007 LA_{15}	—	June 13, 2007	Catalina	CSS	AMO	440 m	MPC · JPL
467528	2007 MN_{27}	—	June 17, 2007	Kitt Peak	Spacewatch	·	2.0 km	MPC · JPL
467529	2007 PU_{30}	—	August 15, 2007	Črni Vrh	Skvarč, J.	·	2.1 km	MPC · JPL
467530	2007 RZ_{9}	—	September 2, 2007	Mount Lemmon	Mount Lemmon Survey	·	610 m	MPC · JPL
467531	2007 RX_{45}	—	September 9, 2007	Kitt Peak	Spacewatch	EOS	1.6 km	MPC · JPL
467532	2007 RX_{83}	—	September 10, 2007	Kitt Peak	Spacewatch	·	2.3 km	MPC · JPL
467533	2007 RH_{117}	—	September 11, 2007	Kitt Peak	Spacewatch	·	2.4 km	MPC · JPL
467534	2007 RN_{163}	—	September 10, 2007	Kitt Peak	Spacewatch	·	3.5 km	MPC · JPL
467535	2007 RY_{209}	—	September 10, 2007	Kitt Peak	Spacewatch	·	2.0 km	MPC · JPL
467536	2007 RR_{213}	—	September 12, 2007	Mount Lemmon	Mount Lemmon Survey	·	1.9 km	MPC · JPL
467537	2007 RM_{296}	—	September 15, 2007	Mount Lemmon	Mount Lemmon Survey	ELF	3.3 km	MPC · JPL
467538	2007 RX_{298}	—	September 9, 2007	Anderson Mesa	LONEOS	·	760 m	MPC · JPL
467539	2007 RS_{308}	—	September 14, 2007	Mount Lemmon	Mount Lemmon Survey	·	2.2 km	MPC · JPL
467540	2007 RG_{318}	—	September 11, 2007	Catalina	CSS	·	3.3 km	MPC · JPL
467541	2007 TF_{1}	—	September 13, 2007	Mount Lemmon	Mount Lemmon Survey	·	660 m	MPC · JPL
467542	2007 TC_{25}	—	October 8, 2007	Calvin-Rehoboth	Calvin College	·	580 m	MPC · JPL
467543	2007 TK_{31}	—	October 4, 2007	Kitt Peak	Spacewatch	·	3.0 km	MPC · JPL
467544	2007 TU_{32}	—	October 6, 2007	Kitt Peak	Spacewatch	·	2.6 km	MPC · JPL
467545	2007 TD_{41}	—	October 6, 2007	Kitt Peak	Spacewatch	·	680 m	MPC · JPL
467546	2007 TJ_{51}	—	October 4, 2007	Kitt Peak	Spacewatch	·	2.5 km	MPC · JPL
467547	2007 TZ_{51}	—	October 4, 2007	Kitt Peak	Spacewatch	·	670 m	MPC · JPL
467548	2007 TE_{81}	—	October 7, 2007	Mount Lemmon	Mount Lemmon Survey	·	760 m	MPC · JPL
467549	2007 TV_{88}	—	October 8, 2007	Mount Lemmon	Mount Lemmon Survey	·	3.5 km	MPC · JPL
467550	2007 TY_{92}	—	September 8, 2007	Mount Lemmon	Mount Lemmon Survey	·	660 m	MPC · JPL
467551	2007 TJ_{98}	—	October 8, 2007	Mount Lemmon	Mount Lemmon Survey	·	3.0 km	MPC · JPL
467552	2007 TE_{104}	—	October 8, 2007	Mount Lemmon	Mount Lemmon Survey	·	4.1 km	MPC · JPL
467553	2007 TF_{109}	—	September 18, 2007	Catalina	CSS	·	2.4 km	MPC · JPL
467554	2007 TP_{119}	—	October 9, 2007	Mount Lemmon	Mount Lemmon Survey	·	3.8 km	MPC · JPL
467555	2007 TQ_{129}	—	September 10, 2007	Mount Lemmon	Mount Lemmon Survey	·	2.4 km	MPC · JPL
467556	2007 TG_{158}	—	October 9, 2007	Socorro	LINEAR	·	660 m	MPC · JPL
467557	2007 TJ_{168}	—	October 8, 2007	Catalina	CSS	·	770 m	MPC · JPL
467558	2007 TN_{191}	—	October 4, 2007	Kitt Peak	Spacewatch	·	650 m	MPC · JPL
467559	2007 TL_{194}	—	October 7, 2007	Mount Lemmon	Mount Lemmon Survey	EOS	2.0 km	MPC · JPL
467560	2007 TO_{196}	—	October 7, 2007	Mount Lemmon	Mount Lemmon Survey	·	1.9 km	MPC · JPL
467561	2007 TV_{215}	—	October 7, 2007	Kitt Peak	Spacewatch	(31811)	3.5 km	MPC · JPL
467562	2007 TG_{216}	—	September 10, 2007	Mount Lemmon	Mount Lemmon Survey	·	2.9 km	MPC · JPL
467563	2007 TT_{216}	—	October 7, 2007	Kitt Peak	Spacewatch	·	3.2 km	MPC · JPL
467564	2007 TS_{230}	—	October 8, 2007	Kitt Peak	Spacewatch	·	2.4 km	MPC · JPL
467565	2007 TL_{243}	—	September 12, 2007	Catalina	CSS	·	710 m	MPC · JPL
467566	2007 TS_{268}	—	October 9, 2007	Kitt Peak	Spacewatch	·	680 m	MPC · JPL
467567	2007 TV_{286}	—	October 10, 2007	Mount Lemmon	Mount Lemmon Survey	·	3.2 km	MPC · JPL
467568	2007 TF_{292}	—	September 14, 2007	Mount Lemmon	Mount Lemmon Survey	·	2.7 km	MPC · JPL
467569	2007 TN_{305}	—	October 13, 2007	Mount Lemmon	Mount Lemmon Survey	·	780 m	MPC · JPL
467570	2007 TU_{332}	—	October 11, 2007	Kitt Peak	Spacewatch	(43176)	2.5 km	MPC · JPL
467571	2007 TD_{354}	—	October 10, 2007	Catalina	CSS	·	2.9 km	MPC · JPL
467572	2007 TL_{386}	—	October 6, 2007	Kitt Peak	Spacewatch	·	3.0 km	MPC · JPL
467573	2007 TQ_{431}	—	October 15, 2007	Mount Lemmon	Mount Lemmon Survey	EOS	2.2 km	MPC · JPL
467574	2007 TU_{432}	—	October 7, 2007	Mount Lemmon	Mount Lemmon Survey	·	680 m	MPC · JPL
467575	2007 TE_{435}	—	October 10, 2007	Kitt Peak	Spacewatch	·	3.3 km	MPC · JPL
467576	2007 TY_{447}	—	October 14, 2007	Mount Lemmon	Mount Lemmon Survey	·	910 m	MPC · JPL
467577	2007 UN_{2}	—	October 3, 2002	Campo Imperatore	CINEOS	·	1.7 km	MPC · JPL
467578	2007 UV_{2}	—	October 9, 2007	Kitt Peak	Spacewatch	·	800 m	MPC · JPL
467579	2007 US_{15}	—	October 18, 2007	Mount Lemmon	Mount Lemmon Survey	EOS	1.8 km	MPC · JPL
467580	2007 UB_{33}	—	October 16, 2007	Catalina	CSS	PHO	1.3 km	MPC · JPL
467581	2007 UN_{50}	—	October 24, 2007	Mount Lemmon	Mount Lemmon Survey	·	1.6 km	MPC · JPL
467582	2007 UK_{74}	—	October 31, 2007	Mount Lemmon	Mount Lemmon Survey	·	650 m	MPC · JPL
467583	2007 UW_{86}	—	October 30, 2007	Kitt Peak	Spacewatch	·	620 m	MPC · JPL
467584	2007 UC_{88}	—	October 14, 2007	Mount Lemmon	Mount Lemmon Survey	·	3.7 km	MPC · JPL
467585	2007 UO_{101}	—	October 30, 2007	Kitt Peak	Spacewatch	·	640 m	MPC · JPL
467586	2007 UH_{110}	—	October 30, 2007	Mount Lemmon	Mount Lemmon Survey	·	2.4 km	MPC · JPL
467587	2007 UW_{131}	—	October 18, 2007	Kitt Peak	Spacewatch	·	2.7 km	MPC · JPL
467588	2007 UD_{141}	—	October 21, 2007	Mount Lemmon	Mount Lemmon Survey	·	2.8 km	MPC · JPL
467589	2007 UT_{141}	—	October 20, 2007	Mount Lemmon	Mount Lemmon Survey	·	960 m	MPC · JPL
467590	2007 VG_{5}	—	October 8, 2007	Catalina	CSS	·	3.5 km	MPC · JPL
467591	2007 VA_{33}	—	October 16, 2007	Mount Lemmon	Mount Lemmon Survey	·	3.4 km	MPC · JPL
467592	2007 VX_{122}	—	October 19, 2007	Mount Lemmon	Mount Lemmon Survey	·	2.9 km	MPC · JPL
467593	2007 VK_{131}	—	October 4, 2007	Kitt Peak	Spacewatch	·	2.2 km	MPC · JPL
467594	2007 VA_{136}	—	November 4, 2007	Mount Lemmon	Mount Lemmon Survey	·	570 m	MPC · JPL
467595	2007 VW_{154}	—	November 5, 2007	Kitt Peak	Spacewatch	·	3.2 km	MPC · JPL
467596	2007 VH_{214}	—	October 20, 2007	Mount Lemmon	Mount Lemmon Survey	·	2.7 km	MPC · JPL
467597	2007 VA_{218}	—	September 15, 2007	Mount Lemmon	Mount Lemmon Survey	EOS	2.1 km	MPC · JPL
467598	2007 VW_{235}	—	November 11, 2007	Mount Lemmon	Mount Lemmon Survey	·	3.2 km	MPC · JPL
467599	2007 VD_{251}	—	November 9, 2007	Catalina	CSS	·	3.3 km	MPC · JPL
467600	2007 VA_{253}	—	November 5, 2007	XuYi	PMO NEO Survey Program	·	2.4 km	MPC · JPL

== 467601–467700 ==
back to top

Designation			Discovery			Properties		Ref
Permanent	Provisional	Named after	Date	Site	Discoverer(s)	Category	Diam.	Ref
467601	2007 VE_{257}	—	November 7, 2007	Kitt Peak	Spacewatch	·	910 m	MPC · JPL
467602	2007 VF_{273}	—	November 12, 2007	Catalina	CSS	PHO	790 m	MPC · JPL
467603	2007 VD_{284}	—	October 15, 2007	Mount Lemmon	Mount Lemmon Survey	·	2.8 km	MPC · JPL
467604	2007 VG_{294}	—	November 1, 2007	Kitt Peak	Spacewatch	·	660 m	MPC · JPL
467605	2007 VU_{298}	—	November 11, 2007	Catalina	CSS	T_{j} (2.97)	4.5 km	MPC · JPL
467606	2007 VK_{299}	—	November 2, 2007	Kitt Peak	Spacewatch	NYS	950 m	MPC · JPL
467607	2007 VC_{315}	—	November 3, 2007	Mount Lemmon	Mount Lemmon Survey	·	760 m	MPC · JPL
467608	2007 WT_{36}	—	October 20, 2007	Mount Lemmon	Mount Lemmon Survey	H	440 m	MPC · JPL
467609	2008 AV_{28}	—	January 11, 2008	Kitt Peak	Spacewatch	APO	480 m	MPC · JPL
467610	2008 AU_{73}	—	January 10, 2008	Mount Lemmon	Mount Lemmon Survey	·	940 m	MPC · JPL
467611	2008 AK_{87}	—	January 12, 2008	Kitt Peak	Spacewatch	·	1.1 km	MPC · JPL
467612	2008 AA_{114}	—	January 10, 2008	Kitt Peak	Spacewatch	·	880 m	MPC · JPL
467613	2008 AU_{116}	—	January 12, 2008	Kitt Peak	Spacewatch	CYB	4.1 km	MPC · JPL
467614	2008 CS_{16}	—	February 3, 2008	Kitt Peak	Spacewatch	MAS	590 m	MPC · JPL
467615	2008 CZ_{51}	—	December 20, 2007	Kitt Peak	Spacewatch	·	990 m	MPC · JPL
467616	2008 CJ_{142}	—	February 8, 2008	Kitt Peak	Spacewatch	·	1.1 km	MPC · JPL
467617	2008 CU_{162}	—	January 30, 2008	Mount Lemmon	Mount Lemmon Survey	NYS	870 m	MPC · JPL
467618	2008 CG_{209}	—	January 15, 2008	Kitt Peak	Spacewatch	·	1.1 km	MPC · JPL
467619	2008 CH_{211}	—	January 1, 2008	Kitt Peak	Spacewatch	·	1.3 km	MPC · JPL
467620	2008 DL_{16}	—	February 18, 2008	Mount Lemmon	Mount Lemmon Survey	NYS	1.2 km	MPC · JPL
467621	2008 DZ_{31}	—	January 11, 2008	Mount Lemmon	Mount Lemmon Survey	·	1.4 km	MPC · JPL
467622	2008 EX_{39}	—	March 4, 2008	Kitt Peak	Spacewatch	·	1.2 km	MPC · JPL
467623	2008 FW_{8}	—	March 26, 2008	Kitt Peak	Spacewatch	V	600 m	MPC · JPL
467624	2008 GX_{42}	—	March 1, 2008	Kitt Peak	Spacewatch	·	980 m	MPC · JPL
467625	2008 GR_{102}	—	March 29, 2008	Kitt Peak	Spacewatch	·	1.0 km	MPC · JPL
467626	2008 GR_{136}	—	April 5, 2008	Kitt Peak	Spacewatch	·	890 m	MPC · JPL
467627	2008 HV_{19}	—	April 26, 2008	Kitt Peak	Spacewatch	(194)	2.8 km	MPC · JPL
467628	2008 KK_{42}	—	May 31, 2008	Mount Lemmon	Mount Lemmon Survey	·	1.7 km	MPC · JPL
467629	2008 LA_{4}	—	November 17, 2006	Kitt Peak	Spacewatch	EUN	1.4 km	MPC · JPL
467630	2008 LV_{4}	—	June 3, 2008	Mount Lemmon	Mount Lemmon Survey	(5)	1.2 km	MPC · JPL
467631	2008 PY_{17}	—	August 13, 2008	La Sagra	OAM	(1547)	1.9 km	MPC · JPL
467632	2008 QB_{28}	—	August 30, 2008	La Sagra	OAM	·	1.7 km	MPC · JPL
467633	2008 QQ_{34}	—	August 26, 2008	Siding Spring	SSS	·	1.6 km	MPC · JPL
467634	2008 RD_{30}	—	September 2, 2008	Kitt Peak	Spacewatch	·	1.7 km	MPC · JPL
467635	2008 RV_{54}	—	September 3, 2008	Kitt Peak	Spacewatch	L4 · (222861)	7.1 km	MPC · JPL
467636	2008 RZ_{71}	—	August 20, 2008	Kitt Peak	Spacewatch	·	2.0 km	MPC · JPL
467637	2008 RE_{111}	—	September 4, 2008	Kitt Peak	Spacewatch	·	1.6 km	MPC · JPL
467638	2008 RJ_{115}	—	September 7, 2008	Mount Lemmon	Mount Lemmon Survey	·	1.4 km	MPC · JPL
467639	2008 RN_{125}	—	September 7, 2008	Mount Lemmon	Mount Lemmon Survey	HOF	2.4 km	MPC · JPL
467640	2008 RQ_{128}	—	September 9, 2008	Kitt Peak	Spacewatch	·	1.6 km	MPC · JPL
467641	2008 SY_{12}	—	September 4, 2008	Kitt Peak	Spacewatch	KOR	1.3 km	MPC · JPL
467642	2008 SX_{16}	—	September 4, 2008	Kitt Peak	Spacewatch	·	2.1 km	MPC · JPL
467643	2008 SN_{50}	—	September 20, 2008	Mount Lemmon	Mount Lemmon Survey	EUN	1.0 km	MPC · JPL
467644	2008 SQ_{90}	—	September 21, 2008	Kitt Peak	Spacewatch	L4	9.2 km	MPC · JPL
467645	2008 SP_{186}	—	September 25, 2008	Kitt Peak	Spacewatch	·	1.6 km	MPC · JPL
467646	2008 SY_{186}	—	September 25, 2008	Kitt Peak	Spacewatch	AGN	1.2 km	MPC · JPL
467647	2008 SM_{192}	—	September 25, 2008	Kitt Peak	Spacewatch	·	1.9 km	MPC · JPL
467648	2008 SC_{211}	—	September 22, 2008	Catalina	CSS	·	3.3 km	MPC · JPL
467649	2008 SN_{211}	—	September 6, 2008	Siding Spring	SSS	·	3.0 km	MPC · JPL
467650	2008 ST_{265}	—	September 29, 2008	Catalina	CSS	DOR	3.1 km	MPC · JPL
467651	2008 SF_{289}	—	September 25, 2008	Kitt Peak	Spacewatch	·	2.1 km	MPC · JPL
467652	2008 SK_{295}	—	September 24, 2008	Catalina	CSS	·	2.8 km	MPC · JPL
467653	2008 TS_{82}	—	July 29, 2008	Kitt Peak	Spacewatch	ADE	2.6 km	MPC · JPL
467654	2008 TB_{100}	—	October 6, 2008	Kitt Peak	Spacewatch	KOR	1.1 km	MPC · JPL
467655	2008 TR_{116}	—	October 1, 2008	Mount Lemmon	Mount Lemmon Survey	·	2.1 km	MPC · JPL
467656	2008 TB_{139}	—	October 8, 2008	Mount Lemmon	Mount Lemmon Survey	·	1.4 km	MPC · JPL
467657	2008 TB_{150}	—	October 9, 2008	Mount Lemmon	Mount Lemmon Survey	AGN	970 m	MPC · JPL
467658	2008 TE_{151}	—	September 4, 2008	Kitt Peak	Spacewatch	·	2.0 km	MPC · JPL
467659	2008 TD_{163}	—	October 1, 2008	Catalina	CSS	DOR	2.4 km	MPC · JPL
467660	2008 TQ_{166}	—	April 2, 2006	Kitt Peak	Spacewatch	·	1.9 km	MPC · JPL
467661	2008 TZ_{167}	—	October 1, 2008	Kitt Peak	Spacewatch	KOR	1.1 km	MPC · JPL
467662	2008 TW_{169}	—	October 8, 2008	Kitt Peak	Spacewatch	·	1.6 km	MPC · JPL
467663	2008 UH_{62}	—	September 9, 2008	Mount Lemmon	Mount Lemmon Survey	·	3.0 km	MPC · JPL
467664	2008 UK_{67}	—	October 21, 2008	Kitt Peak	Spacewatch	EOS	1.9 km	MPC · JPL
467665	2008 UC_{90}	—	October 27, 2008	Socorro	LINEAR	H	660 m	MPC · JPL
467666	2008 UZ_{95}	—	September 29, 2008	Catalina	CSS	JUN	1.1 km	MPC · JPL
467667	2008 UY_{98}	—	September 23, 2008	Kitt Peak	Spacewatch	JUN	1.0 km	MPC · JPL
467668	2008 UQ_{106}	—	September 3, 2008	Kitt Peak	Spacewatch	·	1.9 km	MPC · JPL
467669	2008 UH_{116}	—	October 22, 2008	Kitt Peak	Spacewatch	EOS	1.8 km	MPC · JPL
467670	2008 UJ_{120}	—	October 22, 2008	Kitt Peak	Spacewatch	EOS	1.7 km	MPC · JPL
467671	2008 UV_{121}	—	October 22, 2008	Kitt Peak	Spacewatch	DOR	2.4 km	MPC · JPL
467672	2008 UH_{128}	—	October 22, 2008	Kitt Peak	Spacewatch	·	2.6 km	MPC · JPL
467673	2008 UV_{160}	—	October 23, 2008	Bergisch Gladbach	W. Bickel	·	1.8 km	MPC · JPL
467674	2008 UW_{172}	—	October 24, 2008	Kitt Peak	Spacewatch	·	2.6 km	MPC · JPL
467675	2008 UG_{188}	—	October 1, 2008	Mount Lemmon	Mount Lemmon Survey	·	2.5 km	MPC · JPL
467676	2008 UD_{192}	—	September 23, 2008	Mount Lemmon	Mount Lemmon Survey	TIR	2.7 km	MPC · JPL
467677	2008 UZ_{206}	—	September 23, 2008	Kitt Peak	Spacewatch	·	2.2 km	MPC · JPL
467678	2008 UR_{220}	—	October 25, 2008	Kitt Peak	Spacewatch	·	2.2 km	MPC · JPL
467679	2008 US_{234}	—	October 26, 2008	Mount Lemmon	Mount Lemmon Survey	·	1.8 km	MPC · JPL
467680	2008 UA_{240}	—	October 26, 2008	Kitt Peak	Spacewatch	EOS	1.7 km	MPC · JPL
467681	2008 UF_{240}	—	October 26, 2008	Kitt Peak	Spacewatch	·	3.5 km	MPC · JPL
467682	2008 UB_{275}	—	October 28, 2008	Kitt Peak	Spacewatch	·	2.0 km	MPC · JPL
467683	2008 UJ_{279}	—	October 28, 2008	Mount Lemmon	Mount Lemmon Survey	·	2.9 km	MPC · JPL
467684	2008 UH_{290}	—	October 28, 2008	Kitt Peak	Spacewatch	·	2.1 km	MPC · JPL
467685	2008 UG_{306}	—	October 30, 2008	Kitt Peak	Spacewatch	·	3.2 km	MPC · JPL
467686	2008 UO_{311}	—	October 30, 2008	Kitt Peak	Spacewatch	EOS	1.7 km	MPC · JPL
467687	2008 UO_{345}	—	October 31, 2008	Kitt Peak	Spacewatch	·	2.1 km	MPC · JPL
467688	2008 UX_{356}	—	October 23, 2008	Kitt Peak	Spacewatch	·	1.7 km	MPC · JPL
467689	2008 UU_{357}	—	October 24, 2008	Kitt Peak	Spacewatch	·	2.2 km	MPC · JPL
467690	2008 VV_{27}	—	October 25, 2008	Kitt Peak	Spacewatch	·	2.3 km	MPC · JPL
467691	2008 VA_{33}	—	October 6, 2008	Mount Lemmon	Mount Lemmon Survey	·	1.9 km	MPC · JPL
467692	2008 VK_{42}	—	October 6, 2008	Mount Lemmon	Mount Lemmon Survey	·	2.2 km	MPC · JPL
467693	2008 VW_{67}	—	November 1, 2008	Mount Lemmon	Mount Lemmon Survey	·	2.1 km	MPC · JPL
467694	2008 VS_{74}	—	November 1, 2008	Mount Lemmon	Mount Lemmon Survey	·	2.5 km	MPC · JPL
467695	2008 WT_{37}	—	October 20, 2008	Kitt Peak	Spacewatch	·	2.5 km	MPC · JPL
467696	2008 WH_{41}	—	November 17, 2008	Kitt Peak	Spacewatch	·	2.1 km	MPC · JPL
467697	2008 WW_{46}	—	November 6, 2008	Mount Lemmon	Mount Lemmon Survey	EOS	1.5 km	MPC · JPL
467698	2008 WR_{53}	—	October 28, 2008	Kitt Peak	Spacewatch	·	1.4 km	MPC · JPL
467699	2008 WL_{78}	—	November 1, 2008	Kitt Peak	Spacewatch	·	2.0 km	MPC · JPL
467700	2008 WR_{93}	—	November 20, 2003	Socorro	LINEAR	·	2.6 km	MPC · JPL

== 467701–467800 ==
back to top

Designation			Discovery			Properties		Ref
Permanent	Provisional	Named after	Date	Site	Discoverer(s)	Category	Diam.	Ref
467701	2008 WY_{125}	—	November 8, 2008	Mount Lemmon	Mount Lemmon Survey	·	3.1 km	MPC · JPL
467702	2008 WS_{129}	—	November 17, 2008	Kitt Peak	Spacewatch	·	2.8 km	MPC · JPL
467703	2008 XE_{24}	—	November 8, 2008	Kitt Peak	Spacewatch	EOS	1.7 km	MPC · JPL
467704	2008 XP_{48}	—	December 4, 2008	Mount Lemmon	Mount Lemmon Survey	T_{j} (2.99)	4.3 km	MPC · JPL
467705	2008 YQ_{48}	—	December 22, 2008	Kitt Peak	Spacewatch	·	2.7 km	MPC · JPL
467706	2008 YH_{54}	—	December 29, 2008	Mount Lemmon	Mount Lemmon Survey	·	710 m	MPC · JPL
467707	2008 YY_{100}	—	January 26, 2006	Mount Lemmon	Mount Lemmon Survey	·	670 m	MPC · JPL
467708	2008 YV_{111}	—	May 7, 2006	Mount Lemmon	Mount Lemmon Survey	EOS	1.7 km	MPC · JPL
467709	2008 YQ_{115}	—	November 2, 2008	Mount Lemmon	Mount Lemmon Survey	·	4.1 km	MPC · JPL
467710	2009 AG_{1}	—	December 5, 2008	Kitt Peak	Spacewatch	·	3.6 km	MPC · JPL
467711	2009 AH_{13}	—	January 2, 2009	Mount Lemmon	Mount Lemmon Survey	·	2.6 km	MPC · JPL
467712	2009 AT_{30}	—	December 21, 2008	Mount Lemmon	Mount Lemmon Survey	EOS	1.8 km	MPC · JPL
467713	2009 BJ_{21}	—	January 16, 2009	Mount Lemmon	Mount Lemmon Survey	·	1.0 km	MPC · JPL
467714	2009 BZ_{27}	—	January 16, 2009	Kitt Peak	Spacewatch	·	4.9 km	MPC · JPL
467715	2009 BJ_{34}	—	December 29, 2008	Mount Lemmon	Mount Lemmon Survey	·	2.9 km	MPC · JPL
467716	2009 BA_{69}	—	January 25, 2009	Kitt Peak	Spacewatch	·	2.7 km	MPC · JPL
467717	2009 BM_{70}	—	January 25, 2009	Catalina	CSS	·	4.2 km	MPC · JPL
467718	2009 BD_{167}	—	January 31, 2009	Kitt Peak	Spacewatch	·	520 m	MPC · JPL
467719	2009 CW_{48}	—	December 30, 2008	Mount Lemmon	Mount Lemmon Survey	·	2.9 km	MPC · JPL
467720	2009 DW_{11}	—	February 17, 2009	Socorro	LINEAR	·	810 m	MPC · JPL
467721	2009 DJ_{17}	—	February 3, 2009	Kitt Peak	Spacewatch	·	960 m	MPC · JPL
467722	2009 DR_{117}	—	February 13, 2009	Kitt Peak	Spacewatch	·	780 m	MPC · JPL
467723	2009 FN_{8}	—	February 28, 2009	Kitt Peak	Spacewatch	·	520 m	MPC · JPL
467724	2009 FA_{63}	—	March 26, 2009	Kitt Peak	Spacewatch	·	620 m	MPC · JPL
467725	2009 FY_{73}	—	March 29, 2009	Kitt Peak	Spacewatch	·	670 m	MPC · JPL
467726	2009 HM_{23}	—	April 17, 2009	Mount Lemmon	Mount Lemmon Survey	·	510 m	MPC · JPL
467727	2009 HZ_{65}	—	April 23, 2009	Kitt Peak	Spacewatch	·	780 m	MPC · JPL
467728	2009 HF_{99}	—	April 22, 2009	Mount Lemmon	Mount Lemmon Survey	·	900 m	MPC · JPL
467729	2009 HP_{105}	—	April 27, 2009	Kitt Peak	Spacewatch	·	730 m	MPC · JPL
467730	2009 JY_{17}	—	May 4, 2009	Siding Spring	SSS	PHO	870 m	MPC · JPL
467731	2009 MA_{5}	—	June 17, 2009	Kitt Peak	Spacewatch	·	1.1 km	MPC · JPL
467732	2009 OK_{13}	—	July 27, 2009	Kitt Peak	Spacewatch	·	1.2 km	MPC · JPL
467733	2009 PH_{11}	—	August 15, 2009	Kitt Peak	Spacewatch	·	1.2 km	MPC · JPL
467734	2009 PQ_{13}	—	June 27, 2009	Mount Lemmon	Mount Lemmon Survey	·	1.1 km	MPC · JPL
467735	2009 PV_{19}	—	August 15, 2009	Kitt Peak	Spacewatch	·	1.7 km	MPC · JPL
467736	2009 RQ	—	August 18, 2009	Kitt Peak	Spacewatch	·	1.2 km	MPC · JPL
467737	2009 RS_{14}	—	September 12, 2009	Kitt Peak	Spacewatch	H	390 m	MPC · JPL
467738	2009 RS_{15}	—	September 12, 2009	Kitt Peak	Spacewatch	·	1.2 km	MPC · JPL
467739	2009 RJ_{17}	—	September 12, 2009	Kitt Peak	Spacewatch	(5)	1 km	MPC · JPL
467740	2009 RH_{24}	—	September 13, 2005	Kitt Peak	Spacewatch	·	1.0 km	MPC · JPL
467741	2009 ST_{21}	—	September 18, 2009	Catalina	CSS	·	1.7 km	MPC · JPL
467742	2009 SS_{28}	—	September 16, 2009	Kitt Peak	Spacewatch	·	1.2 km	MPC · JPL
467743	2009 SB_{57}	—	September 17, 2009	Kitt Peak	Spacewatch	L4	8.0 km	MPC · JPL
467744	2009 SS_{64}	—	September 17, 2009	Mount Lemmon	Mount Lemmon Survey	·	980 m	MPC · JPL
467745	2009 SM_{94}	—	September 19, 2009	Mount Lemmon	Mount Lemmon Survey	·	980 m	MPC · JPL
467746	2009 SB_{143}	—	September 19, 2009	Kitt Peak	Spacewatch	L4	9.6 km	MPC · JPL
467747	2009 SK_{156}	—	September 20, 2009	Kitt Peak	Spacewatch	·	780 m	MPC · JPL
467748	2009 SK_{186}	—	September 17, 2009	Kitt Peak	Spacewatch	L4	8.1 km	MPC · JPL
467749	2009 SC_{189}	—	September 21, 2009	La Sagra	OAM	MAR	990 m	MPC · JPL
467750	2009 SL_{199}	—	September 22, 2009	Kitt Peak	Spacewatch	L4	7.9 km	MPC · JPL
467751	2009 SX_{296}	—	September 28, 2009	Kitt Peak	Spacewatch	EUN	840 m	MPC · JPL
467752	2009 SP_{340}	—	September 20, 2009	Kitt Peak	Spacewatch	L4	8.1 km	MPC · JPL
467753	2009 SU_{344}	—	September 18, 2009	Kitt Peak	Spacewatch	·	1.2 km	MPC · JPL
467754	2009 TL_{14}	—	September 20, 2009	Catalina	CSS	·	1.8 km	MPC · JPL
467755	2009 US_{18}	—	October 23, 2009	Tzec Maun	Shurpakov, S.	·	3.3 km	MPC · JPL
467756	2009 UA_{64}	—	October 17, 2009	Mount Lemmon	Mount Lemmon Survey	·	1.3 km	MPC · JPL
467757	2009 UJ_{68}	—	October 1, 2009	Mount Lemmon	Mount Lemmon Survey	·	1.6 km	MPC · JPL
467758	2009 UH_{99}	—	April 11, 2003	Kitt Peak	Spacewatch	·	2.1 km	MPC · JPL
467759	2009 UJ_{135}	—	October 25, 2009	XuYi	PMO NEO Survey Program	·	2.3 km	MPC · JPL
467760	2009 UM_{139}	—	September 22, 2009	Catalina	CSS	H	610 m	MPC · JPL
467761	2009 UL_{146}	—	October 18, 2009	Mount Lemmon	Mount Lemmon Survey	·	1.5 km	MPC · JPL
467762	2009 UY_{149}	—	October 27, 2009	Kitt Peak	Spacewatch	·	1.6 km	MPC · JPL
467763	2009 UV_{150}	—	October 23, 2009	Mount Lemmon	Mount Lemmon Survey	·	1.9 km	MPC · JPL
467764	2009 VF_{5}	—	October 24, 2009	Kitt Peak	Spacewatch	·	1.8 km	MPC · JPL
467765	2009 VU_{6}	—	November 8, 2009	Mount Lemmon	Mount Lemmon Survey	MRX	810 m	MPC · JPL
467766	2009 VV_{14}	—	September 16, 2009	Mount Lemmon	Mount Lemmon Survey	RAF	970 m	MPC · JPL
467767	2009 VC_{26}	—	November 6, 2009	Catalina	CSS	H	440 m	MPC · JPL
467768	2009 VK_{26}	—	November 8, 2009	Kitt Peak	Spacewatch	·	900 m	MPC · JPL
467769	2009 VR_{40}	—	October 27, 2009	Mount Lemmon	Mount Lemmon Survey	H	650 m	MPC · JPL
467770	2009 VL_{47}	—	October 23, 2009	Mount Lemmon	Mount Lemmon Survey	·	1.9 km	MPC · JPL
467771	2009 VS_{65}	—	September 21, 2009	Mount Lemmon	Mount Lemmon Survey	(5)	1.2 km	MPC · JPL
467772	2009 VX_{78}	—	November 10, 2009	Catalina	CSS	·	3.4 km	MPC · JPL
467773	2009 VC_{82}	—	March 15, 2007	Mount Lemmon	Mount Lemmon Survey	·	1.8 km	MPC · JPL
467774	2009 VL_{103}	—	November 11, 2009	Mount Lemmon	Mount Lemmon Survey	·	4.2 km	MPC · JPL
467775	2009 VW_{107}	—	October 26, 2009	Kitt Peak	Spacewatch	·	1.7 km	MPC · JPL
467776	2009 VF_{113}	—	November 10, 2009	Kitt Peak	Spacewatch	·	1.7 km	MPC · JPL
467777	2009 WM_{24}	—	October 14, 2009	Mount Lemmon	Mount Lemmon Survey	L4	7.9 km	MPC · JPL
467778	2009 WZ_{33}	—	October 30, 2005	Mount Lemmon	Mount Lemmon Survey	·	2.4 km	MPC · JPL
467779	2009 WT_{48}	—	November 19, 2009	Mount Lemmon	Mount Lemmon Survey	L4	13 km	MPC · JPL
467780	2009 WV_{65}	—	October 23, 2009	Mount Lemmon	Mount Lemmon Survey	·	2.3 km	MPC · JPL
467781	2009 WT_{114}	—	September 21, 2009	Mount Lemmon	Mount Lemmon Survey	·	1.4 km	MPC · JPL
467782	2009 WC_{135}	—	November 9, 2009	Mount Lemmon	Mount Lemmon Survey	·	1.2 km	MPC · JPL
467783	2009 WU_{149}	—	November 19, 2009	Mount Lemmon	Mount Lemmon Survey	L4	9.3 km	MPC · JPL
467784	2009 WY_{161}	—	October 26, 2009	Mount Lemmon	Mount Lemmon Survey	(5)	1.3 km	MPC · JPL
467785	2009 WZ_{187}	—	December 2, 2005	Kitt Peak	Spacewatch	·	1.1 km	MPC · JPL
467786	2009 WQ_{193}	—	January 23, 2006	Kitt Peak	Spacewatch	·	1.6 km	MPC · JPL
467787	2009 WW_{193}	—	October 26, 2009	Mount Lemmon	Mount Lemmon Survey	NAE	2.0 km	MPC · JPL
467788	2009 WY_{200}	—	November 19, 2009	Kitt Peak	Spacewatch	·	2.0 km	MPC · JPL
467789	2009 WX_{252}	—	November 8, 2009	Kitt Peak	Spacewatch	·	1.6 km	MPC · JPL
467790	2009 WN_{262}	—	November 26, 2009	Mount Lemmon	Mount Lemmon Survey	H	610 m	MPC · JPL
467791	2009 WG_{263}	—	November 16, 2009	Kitt Peak	Spacewatch	·	2.0 km	MPC · JPL
467792	2009 WV_{263}	—	November 23, 2009	Mount Lemmon	Mount Lemmon Survey	EOS	2.1 km	MPC · JPL
467793	2009 XU	—	November 26, 2009	Mount Lemmon	Mount Lemmon Survey	·	2.0 km	MPC · JPL
467794	2009 XE_{1}	—	December 10, 2009	Mayhill	Lowe, A.	ERI	1.6 km	MPC · JPL
467795	2009 YG_{7}	—	November 17, 2009	Kitt Peak	Spacewatch	·	1.8 km	MPC · JPL
467796	2009 YX_{16}	—	November 20, 2009	Kitt Peak	Spacewatch	·	1.3 km	MPC · JPL
467797	2009 YA_{19}	—	November 19, 2003	Kitt Peak	Spacewatch	·	2.8 km	MPC · JPL
467798	2010 AW_{4}	—	January 4, 2010	Kitt Peak	Spacewatch	·	1.1 km	MPC · JPL
467799	2010 AD_{71}	—	January 6, 2010	Catalina	CSS	H	610 m	MPC · JPL
467800	2010 AF_{74}	—	December 20, 2009	Kitt Peak	Spacewatch	H	840 m	MPC · JPL

== 467801–467900 ==
back to top

Designation			Discovery			Properties		Ref
Permanent	Provisional	Named after	Date	Site	Discoverer(s)	Category	Diam.	Ref
467801	2010 AS_{130}	—	September 30, 2009	Mount Lemmon	Mount Lemmon Survey	L4	11 km	MPC · JPL
467802	2010 BS_{35}	—	October 12, 2007	Mount Lemmon	Mount Lemmon Survey	·	3.8 km	MPC · JPL
467803	2010 BB_{48}	—	January 20, 2010	WISE	WISE	·	3.6 km	MPC · JPL
467804	2010 BL_{77}	—	January 24, 2010	WISE	WISE	·	4.4 km	MPC · JPL
467805	2010 BS_{127}	—	May 6, 2010	Mount Lemmon	Mount Lemmon Survey	·	5.0 km	MPC · JPL
467806	2010 BC_{130}	—	September 18, 2009	Mount Lemmon	Mount Lemmon Survey	·	2.1 km	MPC · JPL
467807	2010 CL_{29}	—	February 9, 2010	Kitt Peak	Spacewatch	·	3.7 km	MPC · JPL
467808	2010 CC_{95}	—	February 14, 2010	Kitt Peak	Spacewatch	·	2.3 km	MPC · JPL
467809	2010 CW_{98}	—	February 14, 2010	Kitt Peak	Spacewatch	·	2.0 km	MPC · JPL
467810	2010 CB_{110}	—	November 18, 2003	Kitt Peak	Spacewatch	·	1.7 km	MPC · JPL
467811	2010 CC_{116}	—	February 14, 2010	Mount Lemmon	Mount Lemmon Survey	·	3.5 km	MPC · JPL
467812	2010 CM_{146}	—	January 11, 2010	Kitt Peak	Spacewatch	EOS	1.9 km	MPC · JPL
467813	2010 EW_{31}	—	May 4, 2005	Mount Lemmon	Mount Lemmon Survey	THM	1.8 km	MPC · JPL
467814	2010 EW_{68}	—	March 12, 2010	Mount Lemmon	Mount Lemmon Survey	·	2.6 km	MPC · JPL
467815	2010 EM_{128}	—	March 12, 2010	Kitt Peak	Spacewatch	·	2.3 km	MPC · JPL
467816	2010 FT_{6}	—	August 24, 2007	Kitt Peak	Spacewatch	·	2.7 km	MPC · JPL
467817	2010 FA_{11}	—	March 16, 2010	Kitt Peak	Spacewatch	·	2.8 km	MPC · JPL
467818	2010 GF_{43}	—	November 21, 2009	Mount Lemmon	Mount Lemmon Survey	·	2.5 km	MPC · JPL
467819	2010 JC_{39}	—	May 6, 2010	Mount Lemmon	Mount Lemmon Survey	LIX	3.3 km	MPC · JPL
467820	2010 JV_{48}	—	May 7, 2010	Kitt Peak	Spacewatch	CYB	3.2 km	MPC · JPL
467821	2010 JP_{102}	—	May 11, 2010	WISE	WISE	·	4.7 km	MPC · JPL
467822	2010 KZ_{85}	—	April 10, 2005	Mount Lemmon	Mount Lemmon Survey	·	3.7 km	MPC · JPL
467823	2010 KP_{128}	—	May 22, 2010	Mount Lemmon	Mount Lemmon Survey	T_{j} (2.97)	2.8 km	MPC · JPL
467824	2010 LW_{98}	—	June 13, 2010	WISE	WISE	PHO	1.9 km	MPC · JPL
467825	2010 NO_{117}	—	July 10, 2010	La Sagra	OAM	·	780 m	MPC · JPL
467826	2010 OF_{81}	—	April 24, 2009	Mount Lemmon	Mount Lemmon Survey	·	1.2 km	MPC · JPL
467827	2010 OZ_{101}	—	July 28, 2010	WISE	WISE	T_{j} (2.97)	2.6 km	MPC · JPL
467828	2010 OG_{107}	—	July 29, 2010	WISE	WISE	CYB	3.8 km	MPC · JPL
467829	2010 PL_{61}	—	August 10, 2010	Kitt Peak	Spacewatch	·	690 m	MPC · JPL
467830	2010 RQ_{14}	—	September 1, 2010	Socorro	LINEAR	·	730 m	MPC · JPL
467831	2010 RF_{40}	—	September 4, 2010	La Sagra	OAM	V	790 m	MPC · JPL
467832	2010 RR_{51}	—	September 4, 2010	Kitt Peak	Spacewatch	·	730 m	MPC · JPL
467833	2010 RN_{90}	—	September 2, 2010	Mount Lemmon	Mount Lemmon Survey	·	590 m	MPC · JPL
467834	2010 RU_{154}	—	May 2, 2006	Mount Lemmon	Mount Lemmon Survey	·	590 m	MPC · JPL
467835	2010 SS_{3}	—	September 16, 2010	Mount Lemmon	Mount Lemmon Survey	AMO	220 m	MPC · JPL
467836	2010 SQ_{15}	—	October 30, 2000	Socorro	LINEAR	·	820 m	MPC · JPL
467837	2010 TW_{16}	—	October 3, 2010	Kitt Peak	Spacewatch	·	1.2 km	MPC · JPL
467838	2010 TG_{23}	—	October 1, 2010	Kitt Peak	Spacewatch	V	540 m	MPC · JPL
467839	2010 TZ_{66}	—	September 17, 2003	Kitt Peak	Spacewatch	·	650 m	MPC · JPL
467840	2010 TD_{79}	—	December 3, 2007	Kitt Peak	Spacewatch	·	660 m	MPC · JPL
467841	2010 TU_{112}	—	September 29, 2010	Kitt Peak	Spacewatch	·	620 m	MPC · JPL
467842	2010 TR_{131}	—	October 21, 2003	Kitt Peak	Spacewatch	·	830 m	MPC · JPL
467843	2010 UR_{15}	—	July 20, 2010	WISE	WISE	·	750 m	MPC · JPL
467844	2010 UO_{92}	—	September 30, 2010	Mount Lemmon	Mount Lemmon Survey	PHO	860 m	MPC · JPL
467845	2010 VR_{14}	—	October 16, 2003	Palomar	NEAT	·	1.1 km	MPC · JPL
467846	2010 VF_{28}	—	September 30, 2010	Mount Lemmon	Mount Lemmon Survey	·	1.5 km	MPC · JPL
467847	2010 VL_{40}	—	October 11, 2010	Mount Lemmon	Mount Lemmon Survey	·	710 m	MPC · JPL
467848	2010 VM_{78}	—	November 6, 2010	Mount Lemmon	Mount Lemmon Survey	V	480 m	MPC · JPL
467849	2010 VR_{93}	—	October 19, 2010	Mount Lemmon	Mount Lemmon Survey	·	550 m	MPC · JPL
467850	2010 VL_{106}	—	October 28, 2010	Mount Lemmon	Mount Lemmon Survey	·	760 m	MPC · JPL
467851	2010 VT_{106}	—	February 13, 2008	Mount Lemmon	Mount Lemmon Survey	·	1.1 km	MPC · JPL
467852	2010 VT_{151}	—	November 6, 2010	Mount Lemmon	Mount Lemmon Survey	L4	9.5 km	MPC · JPL
467853	2010 VM_{176}	—	November 5, 2010	Mount Lemmon	Mount Lemmon Survey	·	1.2 km	MPC · JPL
467854	2010 VQ_{177}	—	October 19, 2010	Mount Lemmon	Mount Lemmon Survey	L4	7.1 km	MPC · JPL
467855	2010 WE_{15}	—	November 27, 1998	Kitt Peak	Spacewatch	L4	8.0 km	MPC · JPL
467856	2010 WE_{31}	—	November 5, 2010	Kitt Peak	Spacewatch	L4	8.3 km	MPC · JPL
467857	2010 WK_{50}	—	December 13, 2006	Mount Lemmon	Mount Lemmon Survey	·	1.1 km	MPC · JPL
467858	2010 WM_{61}	—	November 10, 2010	Mount Lemmon	Mount Lemmon Survey	L4	9.6 km	MPC · JPL
467859	2010 XL_{33}	—	January 20, 2010	WISE	WISE	L4	10 km	MPC · JPL
467860	2011 AF_{5}	—	December 21, 2006	Kitt Peak	Spacewatch	·	1.6 km	MPC · JPL
467861	2011 AK_{6}	—	October 14, 2010	Mount Lemmon	Mount Lemmon Survey	(5)	1.2 km	MPC · JPL
467862	2011 AL_{22}	—	October 1, 2005	Kitt Peak	Spacewatch	·	1.2 km	MPC · JPL
467863	2011 AK_{28}	—	August 30, 2005	Campo Imperatore	CINEOS	(5)	1.2 km	MPC · JPL
467864	2011 AA_{32}	—	January 10, 2011	Mount Lemmon	Mount Lemmon Survey	(5)	990 m	MPC · JPL
467865	2011 BP_{15}	—	March 15, 2007	Kitt Peak	Spacewatch	·	1.2 km	MPC · JPL
467866	2011 BR_{64}	—	January 24, 2011	Mount Lemmon	Mount Lemmon Survey	·	1.4 km	MPC · JPL
467867	2011 BO_{76}	—	June 30, 2008	Kitt Peak	Spacewatch	·	1.2 km	MPC · JPL
467868	2011 BZ_{84}	—	December 8, 2010	Mount Lemmon	Mount Lemmon Survey	(5)	1.4 km	MPC · JPL
467869	2011 BL_{86}	—	February 23, 2007	Kitt Peak	Spacewatch	·	1.5 km	MPC · JPL
467870	2011 BN_{93}	—	January 28, 2011	Mount Lemmon	Mount Lemmon Survey	·	1.4 km	MPC · JPL
467871	2011 BX_{106}	—	January 29, 2011	Mount Lemmon	Mount Lemmon Survey	·	1.5 km	MPC · JPL
467872	2011 BN_{120}	—	January 11, 2011	Mount Lemmon	Mount Lemmon Survey	·	1.8 km	MPC · JPL
467873	2011 BK_{130}	—	October 25, 2005	Kitt Peak	Spacewatch	·	1.3 km	MPC · JPL
467874	2011 CF_{7}	—	March 25, 2003	Kitt Peak	Spacewatch	·	1.1 km	MPC · JPL
467875	2011 CC_{26}	—	January 16, 2011	Mount Lemmon	Mount Lemmon Survey	·	1.1 km	MPC · JPL
467876	2011 CN_{89}	—	August 25, 2004	Kitt Peak	Spacewatch	·	2.7 km	MPC · JPL
467877	2011 CE_{103}	—	March 13, 2007	Kitt Peak	Spacewatch	·	1.6 km	MPC · JPL
467878	2011 DN_{4}	—	March 25, 2006	Catalina	CSS	H	610 m	MPC · JPL
467879	2011 DV_{8}	—	January 8, 2011	Mount Lemmon	Mount Lemmon Survey	·	1.9 km	MPC · JPL
467880	2011 DZ_{9}	—	February 11, 2011	Mount Lemmon	Mount Lemmon Survey	DOR	2.0 km	MPC · JPL
467881	2011 DQ_{20}	—	February 8, 2011	Mount Lemmon	Mount Lemmon Survey	·	1.4 km	MPC · JPL
467882	2011 DQ_{21}	—	October 8, 2004	Kitt Peak	Spacewatch	·	1.5 km	MPC · JPL
467883	2011 DH_{23}	—	January 25, 2006	Kitt Peak	Spacewatch	·	1.8 km	MPC · JPL
467884	2011 EQ_{6}	—	September 4, 2008	Kitt Peak	Spacewatch	·	1.6 km	MPC · JPL
467885	2011 EM_{37}	—	March 6, 2011	Kitt Peak	Spacewatch	·	2.5 km	MPC · JPL
467886	2011 EP_{83}	—	February 23, 2011	Kitt Peak	Spacewatch	·	2.2 km	MPC · JPL
467887	2011 FS_{23}	—	April 7, 2006	Kitt Peak	Spacewatch	EOS	1.8 km	MPC · JPL
467888	2011 FD_{26}	—	March 30, 2011	Piszkéstető	K. Sárneczky, Z. Kuli	·	2.5 km	MPC · JPL
467889	2011 FJ_{45}	—	March 29, 2011	Kitt Peak	Spacewatch	·	1.8 km	MPC · JPL
467890	2011 GC_{35}	—	October 11, 2007	Mount Lemmon	Mount Lemmon Survey	·	3.2 km	MPC · JPL
467891	2011 GN_{63}	—	April 4, 2011	Kitt Peak	Spacewatch	·	2.2 km	MPC · JPL
467892	2011 GD_{85}	—	March 24, 2006	Mount Lemmon	Mount Lemmon Survey	·	1.9 km	MPC · JPL
467893	2011 HZ_{9}	—	November 18, 2008	Kitt Peak	Spacewatch	·	3.0 km	MPC · JPL
467894	2011 HJ_{11}	—	April 22, 2011	Kitt Peak	Spacewatch	·	2.7 km	MPC · JPL
467895	2011 HP_{29}	—	October 26, 2008	Kitt Peak	Spacewatch	·	2.0 km	MPC · JPL
467896	2011 HL_{36}	—	January 6, 2010	Kitt Peak	Spacewatch	·	2.1 km	MPC · JPL
467897	2011 HY_{36}	—	February 16, 2010	Mount Lemmon	Mount Lemmon Survey	·	1.6 km	MPC · JPL
467898	2011 HH_{40}	—	April 3, 2010	WISE	WISE	·	2.5 km	MPC · JPL
467899	2011 HP_{41}	—	May 18, 2010	WISE	WISE	·	5.3 km	MPC · JPL
467900	2011 HD_{53}	—	April 30, 2011	Mount Lemmon	Mount Lemmon Survey	H	470 m	MPC · JPL

== 467901–468000 ==
back to top

Designation			Discovery			Properties		Ref
Permanent	Provisional	Named after	Date	Site	Discoverer(s)	Category	Diam.	Ref
467901	2011 HN_{61}	—	April 24, 2011	Kitt Peak	Spacewatch	H	620 m	MPC · JPL
467902	2011 HA_{68}	—	September 30, 2003	Kitt Peak	Spacewatch	·	2.1 km	MPC · JPL
467903	2011 HC_{73}	—	April 19, 2006	Mount Lemmon	Mount Lemmon Survey	·	1.5 km	MPC · JPL
467904	2011 HL_{76}	—	April 24, 2011	Kitt Peak	Spacewatch	·	4.0 km	MPC · JPL
467905	2011 HD_{94}	—	April 13, 2011	Mount Lemmon	Mount Lemmon Survey	·	2.5 km	MPC · JPL
467906	2011 JB_{19}	—	February 14, 2010	Mount Lemmon	Mount Lemmon Survey	EOS	1.7 km	MPC · JPL
467907	2011 KM_{3}	—	May 17, 2010	WISE	WISE	·	3.8 km	MPC · JPL
467908	2011 KD_{7}	—	May 26, 2010	WISE	WISE	·	3.6 km	MPC · JPL
467909	2011 KR_{23}	—	May 3, 2010	WISE	WISE	·	2.6 km	MPC · JPL
467910	2011 KT_{26}	—	October 13, 2007	Kitt Peak	Spacewatch	·	2.5 km	MPC · JPL
467911	2011 KK_{47}	—	September 13, 2007	Mount Lemmon	Mount Lemmon Survey	·	1.5 km	MPC · JPL
467912	2011 KM_{47}	—	May 17, 2010	WISE	WISE	·	3.4 km	MPC · JPL
467913	2011 LW_{3}	—	May 27, 2011	Catalina	CSS	·	3.0 km	MPC · JPL
467914	2011 LF_{16}	—	November 20, 2009	Mount Lemmon	Mount Lemmon Survey	H	560 m	MPC · JPL
467915	2011 LT_{19}	—	February 12, 2004	Kitt Peak	Spacewatch	·	3.1 km	MPC · JPL
467916	2011 OA_{14}	—	December 12, 2006	Kitt Peak	Spacewatch	·	1.3 km	MPC · JPL
467917	2011 OP_{24}	—	July 28, 2011	Haleakala	Pan-STARRS 1	APO	380 m	MPC · JPL
467918	2011 OU_{26}	—	February 16, 2010	Siding Spring	SSS	·	4.8 km	MPC · JPL
467919	2011 QU_{74}	—	March 18, 2010	Kitt Peak	Spacewatch	LIX	2.6 km	MPC · JPL
467920	2011 SF_{226}	—	September 24, 2011	Catalina	CSS	H	460 m	MPC · JPL
467921	2011 TS	—	September 24, 2011	Catalina	CSS	H	560 m	MPC · JPL
467922	2011 UJ_{26}	—	October 17, 2011	Kitt Peak	Spacewatch	3:2	5.9 km	MPC · JPL
467923	2011 YU_{28}	—	June 16, 2007	Kitt Peak	Spacewatch	·	930 m	MPC · JPL
467924	2011 YK_{39}	—	December 29, 2011	Kitt Peak	Spacewatch	·	1.5 km	MPC · JPL
467925	2011 YL_{56}	—	December 29, 2011	Kitt Peak	Spacewatch	·	760 m	MPC · JPL
467926	2012 AE_{16}	—	December 3, 2010	Mount Lemmon	Mount Lemmon Survey	L4	10 km	MPC · JPL
467927	2012 AY_{17}	—	September 24, 2008	Mount Lemmon	Mount Lemmon Survey	L4	7.5 km	MPC · JPL
467928	2012 AE_{22}	—	December 15, 2004	Catalina	CSS	·	1.1 km	MPC · JPL
467929	2012 BH_{24}	—	January 18, 2012	Mount Lemmon	Mount Lemmon Survey	·	2.1 km	MPC · JPL
467930	2012 BP_{52}	—	January 21, 2012	Kitt Peak	Spacewatch	·	1.1 km	MPC · JPL
467931	2012 BQ_{66}	—	January 4, 2012	Mount Lemmon	Mount Lemmon Survey	·	1.1 km	MPC · JPL
467932	2012 BS_{69}	—	January 21, 2012	Kitt Peak	Spacewatch	·	900 m	MPC · JPL
467933	2012 BG_{90}	—	January 26, 2012	Mount Lemmon	Mount Lemmon Survey	·	880 m	MPC · JPL
467934	2012 BG_{113}	—	November 5, 2007	Kitt Peak	Spacewatch	·	820 m	MPC · JPL
467935	2012 BX_{126}	—	May 4, 2005	Mount Lemmon	Mount Lemmon Survey	·	1.2 km	MPC · JPL
467936	2012 BN_{129}	—	February 2, 2005	Kitt Peak	Spacewatch	·	630 m	MPC · JPL
467937	2012 BV_{149}	—	December 5, 2007	Kitt Peak	Spacewatch	·	990 m	MPC · JPL
467938	2012 CK_{8}	—	March 17, 2005	Kitt Peak	Spacewatch	·	880 m	MPC · JPL
467939	2012 CJ_{35}	—	March 10, 2005	Mount Lemmon	Mount Lemmon Survey	·	800 m	MPC · JPL
467940	2012 CK_{52}	—	March 8, 2005	Kitt Peak	Spacewatch	·	830 m	MPC · JPL
467941	2012 DN_{1}	—	March 11, 2005	Kitt Peak	Spacewatch	·	810 m	MPC · JPL
467942	2012 DL_{23}	—	February 21, 2012	Kitt Peak	Spacewatch	MAS	620 m	MPC · JPL
467943	2012 DR_{36}	—	February 23, 2012	Mount Lemmon	Mount Lemmon Survey	NYS	990 m	MPC · JPL
467944	2012 DP_{44}	—	December 18, 2007	Mount Lemmon	Mount Lemmon Survey	·	940 m	MPC · JPL
467945	2012 DM_{51}	—	February 19, 2012	Kitt Peak	Spacewatch	MAS	590 m	MPC · JPL
467946	2012 DG_{63}	—	January 27, 2012	Mount Lemmon	Mount Lemmon Survey	·	530 m	MPC · JPL
467947	2012 DP_{63}	—	February 11, 2012	Mount Lemmon	Mount Lemmon Survey	·	670 m	MPC · JPL
467948	2012 DS_{64}	—	September 9, 2010	Kitt Peak	Spacewatch	·	1.2 km	MPC · JPL
467949	2012 FA_{9}	—	February 1, 2012	Kitt Peak	Spacewatch	NYS	860 m	MPC · JPL
467950	2012 FT_{12}	—	September 6, 1999	Kitt Peak	Spacewatch	·	970 m	MPC · JPL
467951	2012 FQ_{21}	—	February 8, 2008	Mount Lemmon	Mount Lemmon Survey	NYS	980 m	MPC · JPL
467952	2012 FE_{40}	—	October 13, 2010	Mount Lemmon	Mount Lemmon Survey	·	1.2 km	MPC · JPL
467953	2012 FT_{40}	—	March 13, 2012	Kitt Peak	Spacewatch	·	1.3 km	MPC · JPL
467954	2012 FX_{52}	—	October 19, 2006	Kitt Peak	Deep Ecliptic Survey	NYS	830 m	MPC · JPL
467955	2012 HH_{4}	—	January 4, 2011	Mount Lemmon	Mount Lemmon Survey	·	1.4 km	MPC · JPL
467956	2012 HM_{6}	—	November 5, 2005	Mount Lemmon	Mount Lemmon Survey	·	1.5 km	MPC · JPL
467957	2012 HN_{17}	—	January 25, 2011	Mount Lemmon	Mount Lemmon Survey	·	1.7 km	MPC · JPL
467958	2012 HU_{42}	—	April 18, 2012	Kitt Peak	Spacewatch	·	1.4 km	MPC · JPL
467959	2012 HZ_{42}	—	March 28, 2012	Mount Lemmon	Mount Lemmon Survey	EUN	1.2 km	MPC · JPL
467960	2012 HG_{57}	—	October 27, 2005	Kitt Peak	Spacewatch	·	1.5 km	MPC · JPL
467961	2012 HR_{65}	—	March 31, 2012	Mount Lemmon	Mount Lemmon Survey	·	1.8 km	MPC · JPL
467962	2012 JC_{9}	—	December 25, 2010	Mount Lemmon	Mount Lemmon Survey	·	1.0 km	MPC · JPL
467963	2012 JT_{17}	—	May 15, 2012	Mount Lemmon	Mount Lemmon Survey	APO	630 m	MPC · JPL
467964	2012 JT_{24}	—	March 27, 2012	Kitt Peak	Spacewatch	·	1.4 km	MPC · JPL
467965	2012 JC_{33}	—	January 14, 2011	Mount Lemmon	Mount Lemmon Survey	·	850 m	MPC · JPL
467966	2012 JJ_{60}	—	April 28, 2012	Mount Lemmon	Mount Lemmon Survey	·	1.2 km	MPC · JPL
467967	2012 KA_{1}	—	October 23, 2009	Mount Lemmon	Mount Lemmon Survey	·	1.3 km	MPC · JPL
467968	2012 KS_{10}	—	November 18, 2009	Mount Lemmon	Mount Lemmon Survey	·	960 m	MPC · JPL
467969	2012 KJ_{12}	—	January 11, 2011	Kitt Peak	Spacewatch	·	2.1 km	MPC · JPL
467970	2012 KK_{44}	—	October 26, 2009	Kitt Peak	Spacewatch	·	1.5 km	MPC · JPL
467971	2012 KS_{45}	—	May 29, 2012	Mount Lemmon	Mount Lemmon Survey	RAF	960 m	MPC · JPL
467972	2012 KG_{48}	—	December 24, 2005	Kitt Peak	Spacewatch	·	2.1 km	MPC · JPL
467973	2012 KT_{50}	—	February 25, 2012	Mount Lemmon	Mount Lemmon Survey	·	1.8 km	MPC · JPL
467974	2012 LR_{4}	—	July 25, 2008	Mount Lemmon	Mount Lemmon Survey	·	2.3 km	MPC · JPL
467975	2012 LW_{10}	—	February 6, 2010	WISE	WISE	·	3.1 km	MPC · JPL
467976	2012 LY_{13}	—	June 8, 2012	Mount Lemmon	Mount Lemmon Survey	·	2.7 km	MPC · JPL
467977	2012 LM_{17}	—	May 14, 2012	Mount Lemmon	Mount Lemmon Survey	·	1.2 km	MPC · JPL
467978	2012 PT_{15}	—	April 26, 2011	Mount Lemmon	Mount Lemmon Survey	·	1.7 km	MPC · JPL
467979	2012 PE_{21}	—	July 18, 2007	Mount Lemmon	Mount Lemmon Survey	·	2.0 km	MPC · JPL
467980	2012 QJ_{16}	—	September 18, 1995	Kitt Peak	Spacewatch	ADE	1.4 km	MPC · JPL
467981	2012 QH_{39}	—	December 31, 2008	Kitt Peak	Spacewatch	·	3.5 km	MPC · JPL
467982	2012 QR_{43}	—	January 2, 2009	Kitt Peak	Spacewatch	·	3.3 km	MPC · JPL
467983	2012 RK_{10}	—	April 27, 2007	Kitt Peak	Spacewatch	·	1.6 km	MPC · JPL
467984	2012 RM_{42}	—	March 14, 2007	Mount Lemmon	Mount Lemmon Survey	·	1.6 km	MPC · JPL
467985	2012 SM_{14}	—	October 31, 2007	Kitt Peak	Spacewatch	EMA	2.7 km	MPC · JPL
467986	2012 SN_{52}	—	April 7, 2005	Kitt Peak	Spacewatch	·	2.6 km	MPC · JPL
467987	2012 TR_{3}	—	September 16, 2012	Mount Lemmon	Mount Lemmon Survey	·	2.5 km	MPC · JPL
467988	2012 TT_{33}	—	September 15, 2012	Mount Lemmon	Mount Lemmon Survey	THM	2.2 km	MPC · JPL
467989	2012 TU_{42}	—	September 18, 2007	Mount Lemmon	Mount Lemmon Survey	·	3.4 km	MPC · JPL
467990	2012 TX_{94}	—	September 19, 2001	Socorro	LINEAR	·	2.3 km	MPC · JPL
467991	2012 TV_{96}	—	June 11, 2005	Kitt Peak	Spacewatch	·	2.9 km	MPC · JPL
467992	2012 TO_{151}	—	October 20, 2001	Socorro	LINEAR	·	2.3 km	MPC · JPL
467993	2012 TD_{163}	—	November 17, 2001	Kitt Peak	Spacewatch	·	2.6 km	MPC · JPL
467994	2012 TF_{164}	—	January 24, 2010	WISE	WISE	·	4.0 km	MPC · JPL
467995	2012 TJ_{216}	—	April 7, 2006	Catalina	CSS	H	530 m	MPC · JPL
467996	2012 TE_{264}	—	April 3, 2010	Kitt Peak	Spacewatch	·	2.6 km	MPC · JPL
467997	2012 TX_{271}	—	November 3, 2007	Kitt Peak	Spacewatch	·	2.1 km	MPC · JPL
467998	2012 TW_{285}	—	October 8, 2012	Mount Lemmon	Mount Lemmon Survey	·	2.7 km	MPC · JPL
467999	2012 UM_{46}	—	October 28, 2006	Mount Lemmon	Mount Lemmon Survey	CYB	3.4 km	MPC · JPL
468000	2012 UV_{86}	—	June 29, 2005	Kitt Peak	Spacewatch	·	3.3 km	MPC · JPL

back to top
