= Alikoski =

Alikoski is a surname. Notable people with the surname include:

- Heikki A. Alikoski (1912–1997), Finnish astronomer
- Mikko Alikoski (born 1986), Finnish ice hockey player

== See also ==
- 1567 Alikoski, a main-belt asteroid
