= 52246 Donaldjohanson =

Main-belt asteroid

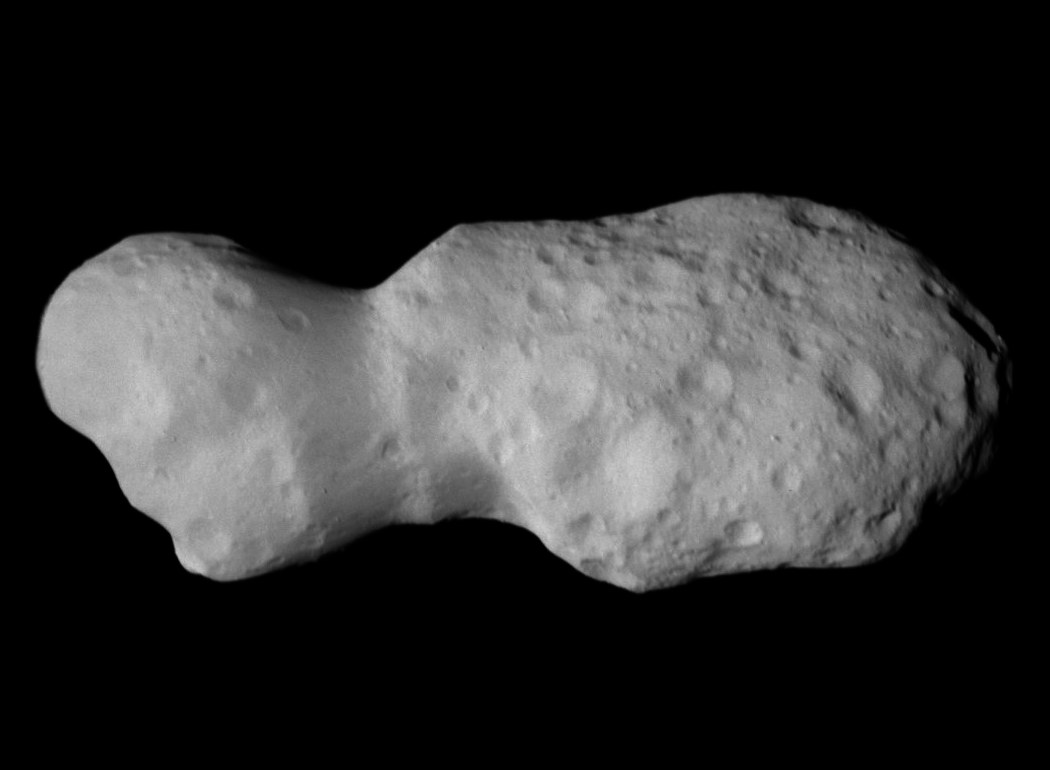
- Donaldjohanson photographed by the Lucy spacecraft on 20 April 2025

Discovery
- Discovered by: Schelte J. Bus
- Discovery site: Siding Spring Obs.
- Discovery date: 2 March 1981

Designations
- Named after: Donald Johanson (paleoanthropologist)
- Alternative designations: "DJ" (abbreviation); 1981 EQ_{5}; 1998 YF_{26}
- Minor planet category: main-belt (inner) · Erigone

Orbital characteristics
- Epoch 9 June 2026 (JD 2461200.5)
- Uncertainty parameter 0
- Earliest precovery date: 14 February 1981
- Aphelion: 2.829 AU
- Perihelion: 1.938 AU
- Semi-major axis: 2.384 AU
- Eccentricity: 0.1869
- Orbital period (sidereal): 3.68 yr (1,344 d)
- Mean anomaly: 147.853°
- Mean motion: 0° 16^{m} 4.033^{s} / day
- Inclination: 4.425°
- Longitude of ascending node: 262.777°
- Argument of perihelion: 212.882°
- Known satellites: 0

Proper orbital elements
- Proper semi-major axis: 2.384 AU
- Proper eccentricity: 0.214
- Proper inclination: 5.32°
- Proper mean motion: 97.7751 deg / yr
- Proper orbital period: 3.68192 yr (1344.821 d)
- Precession of perihelion long.: 38.9 arcsec / yr
- Precession of asc. node: −46.7 arcsec / yr

Physical characteristics
- Dimensions: 8.8 km × 4.4 km × 3.1 km
- Mean diameter: ~ 4.8 km (volume equivalent) (Note: A volume of V = 58 km^{3} is equivalent to a sphere of radius $r {{=}} \left( \frac{3V}{4\pi} \right)^{1/3}$ ≈ 2.4 km, or a diameter of 4.8 km. This formula is derived by rearranging the formula for the volume of a sphere.)
- Volume: ~ 58 km^{3}
- Mass: 7×10^{13} kg (assumed)
- Mean density: 1.2 g/cm^{3} (assumed)
- Sidereal rotation period: 252.6±0.4 h (primary) (Note: The 252-hour period is derived from the roll precession ($P_{\psi}$) and yaw precession ($P_{\varphi}$) periods via the following linear combination of frequencies (inverse periods): $\left( \frac{1}{P_{\varphi}} - \frac{1}{P_{\psi}} \right)^{-1} \approx 252.2 \text{ h}$. NASA describes the 252-hour period as the time it takes for Donaldjohanson to rotate end-over-end. For a detailed explanation of yaw, pitch, and roll (φ, θ, ψ) angles and their notation, see Euler angles.); 637.0 h (roll precession); 180.7 h (yaw precession)
- Axial tilt: ≈ 5° (to orbit) (Note: 5° is the axial tilt (obliquity) of Donaldjohanson's angular momentum vector with respect to its orbital plane.)
- North pole right ascension: 272.0° (ang. mom.) (Note: The equatorial coordinates (RA, Dec) = (272.0°, +66.7°) represent the direction of Donaldjohanson's angular momentum vector.); 324.66115° (Note: The equatorial coordinates (RA, Dec) = (324.66115°, +50.95721°) represent the direction of Donaldjohanson's spin pole at the time of Lucy's close encounter.)
- North pole declination: +66.7° (ang. mom.); +50.95721°
- Geometric albedo: 0.045+0.034 −0.019
- Spectral type: C
- Absolute magnitude (H): 15.45 (WISE); 15.61 (JPL/MPC)

52246 Donaldjohanson is an asteroid located in the inner main asteroid belt, between the orbits of Mars and Jupiter. It is an elongated contact binary consisting of two conjoined lobes spanning 8.8 kilometers (5.5 miles) in total length. The asteroid was discovered on 2 March 1981 by astronomer Schelte Bus at Siding Spring Observatory in Australia and was named after American paleoanthropologist Donald Johanson. It was visited by NASA's Lucy mission on 20 April 2025.

Donaldjohanson is classified as a C-type asteroid, because it has a dark surface made of carbonaceous chondrite-like minerals. Both of its lobes are heavily cratered by past asteroid impacts, whereas the neck connecting them appears smoothed out by relatively recent landslides less than 20 million years ago. Several geological features on Donaldjohanson, including boulders, craters, and ridges, have been named after various paleoanthropological sites and hominin fossils.

Instead of rotating around a single axis, Donaldjohanson wobbles chaotically. It slowly rotates end-over-end once every 253 hours (10.5 days), and wobbles back and forth around its long axis once every 637 hours (26.5 days). The slow, tumbling rotation is believed to have been caused by the YORP effect, which is a gradual torque exerted by sunlight. Donaldjohanson is a member of the Erigone family, a collisional family of asteroids with physical and orbital properties similar to 163 Erigone. Donaldjohanson and the Erigone family are believed to have formed within the last 270 million years, in the aftermath of a catastrophic collision between two once-larger asteroids.

== History ==
=== Discovery ===
Donaldjohanson was discovered by astronomer Schelte J. Bus while scanning observations made by the U.K. Schmidt–Caltech Asteroid Survey. (Note: The MPC's observations database cites "MPC 7101" as the publication source for the asteroid's discovery observation. "MPC 7101" was published by the MPC on 4 August 1982. The document containing MPC 7101 also contains "MPC 7087", which provides the context behind the observations tabulated in MPC 7087.) The observations were made on 2 March 1981 using the 1.2-meter (4 ft) U.K. Schmidt Telescope at Siding Spring Observatory, Australia. The Minor Planet Center (MPC) published the asteroid's discovery in August 1982 and gave it the provisional designation 1981 EQ_{5}.

From 1983 to 1985, the MPC published additional Siding Spring observations of Donaldjohanson from 14 February, 1 March, and 3 May 1981. (Note: The MPC's observations database cites "MPC 9627", "MPC 8233", and "MPC 10244" as the publication sources for the Siding Spring observations made on 14 February, 1 March, and 3 May 1981. "MPC 9627" was published by the MPC on 4 May 1985, "MPC 8233" on 20 November 1983, and "MPC 10244" on 27 December 1985.) However, the asteroid was not observed again until 16 December 1998, when it was rediscovered as a seemingly new asteroid by the Lincoln Near-Earth Asteroid Research (LINEAR) project in New Mexico. The MPC published LINEAR's observations with the provisional designation 1998 YF_{26} in January 1999. (Note: The MPC's observations database cites "MPS 3483" as the publication source for the asteroid's discovery observation. "MPS 3483" was published by the MPC on 6 January 1999.) In February 1999, Arno Gnädig reported that 1998 YF_{26} was the same object as 1981 EQ_{5}.

=== Naming and exploration ===
Donaldjohanson has the minor planet number 52246, which was given by the MPC on 16 February 2003. The asteroid was named in honor of Donald C. Johanson, an American paleoanthropologist who discovered the "Lucy" hominid fossil in 1974. For the asteroid, Donald Johanson's first and last names were concatenated to conform with the International Astronomical Union's naming rules. The asteroid's name is commonly abbreviated as "DJ".

The Lucy fossil lends its name to NASA's eponymous spacecraft, which visited Donaldjohanson on 20 April 2025. The Lucy spacecraft's primary objective is to explore Jupiter's trojan asteroids, which NASA has described as "fossils" of the Solar System. Donaldjohanson received its name from Lucy mission scientists after they found that the asteroid coincided with the spacecraft's planned trajectory. The MPC announced the asteroid's name on 25 December 2015, nearly three months after NASA's selection of Lucy for the Discovery Program and almost six years before the spacecraft's launch. In a 2021 interview with Space.com, Donald Johanson remarked that he was "enormously excited" to watch the launch of the spacecraft and said that the naming was "something that was utterly and totally unanticipated in my life".

During the years before Lucy's encounter with Donaldjohanson, astronomers studied the asteroid with telescopes on Earth. They were able to determine that the asteroid was highly elongated, slowly rotating, and carbon-rich, although much of its exact details were uncertain. On 20 and 22 February 2025, the Lucy spacecraft took its first images of Donaldjohanson from a distance of approximately 70 million km (43 million mi). Over the two months leading up to its encounter, the spacecraft continued observing the asteroid from afar. Lucy made its closest approach to Donaldjohanson on 20 April 2025 17:51 UTC, at a distance of 960 km (600 mi) and a relative speed of 13.4 km/s (8.3 mi/s). The spacecraft photographed the asteroid at resolutions of up to 5.2 meters (17 ft) per pixel, but stopped 40 seconds before closest approach in order to avoid pointing its instruments too close to the Sun. During this time, Johanson was at the Southwest Research Institute in Colorado to watch the encounter live. This was the first time a spacecraft has visited an asteroid named after a living person.

Timelapse of Lucy's approach to Donaldjohanson on 20 April 2025

A top-down view of the inner Solar System, showing Lucy's path as it passes Donaldjohanson in the asteroid belt

A ride-along view of Lucy's flyby of Donaldjohanson

== Orbit ==
Donaldjohanson is located in the inner region of the main asteroid belt between the orbits of Mars and Jupiter. It follows an elliptical orbit around the Sun, with an average distance (semi-major axis) of 2.38 astronomical units (AU) and an orbital period of 3.68 Earth years. It has an eccentricity of 0.19 and an inclination of 4.4° with respect to the ecliptic, although over long periods of time they can change and average out to 0.21 and 5.3°. Throughout its elliptical orbit, the asteroid's distance from the Sun varies from 1.9 AU at perihelion to 2.8 AU at aphelion.

Donaldjohanson's orbit is similar to that of the large asteroid 163 Erigone, and it has been identified as a member of the Erigone family. Like the majority of Erigone family members, Donaldjohanson's orbit is not influenced by any meaningfully strong orbital resonances with another planet. However, its high eccentricity leads to chaotic changes in its orbit over relatively short timescales, with a Lyapunov time of about 12,000 years. Over a period of 10 million years, Donaldjohanson's perihelion distance may drop to 1.727 AU, which would bring it close enough to Mars to weakly influence the asteroid's orbit. N-body simulations predict that the asteroid's orbit will remain stable for at least 1 billion years, but its semi-major axis will undergo small random variations on the order of 0.001 AU. Donaldjohanson's semi-major axis is also predicted to be slowly drifting outward at a rate of 8.4×10^{−5} AU per million years due to the Yarkovsky effect. The Yarkovsky effect is a phenomenon involving the asteroid absorbing sunlight and asymmetrically radiating it away, which pushes the asteroid away from the Sun if it rotates in the same direction as its orbit (see section § Rotation).

== Physical characteristics ==
=== Geology ===
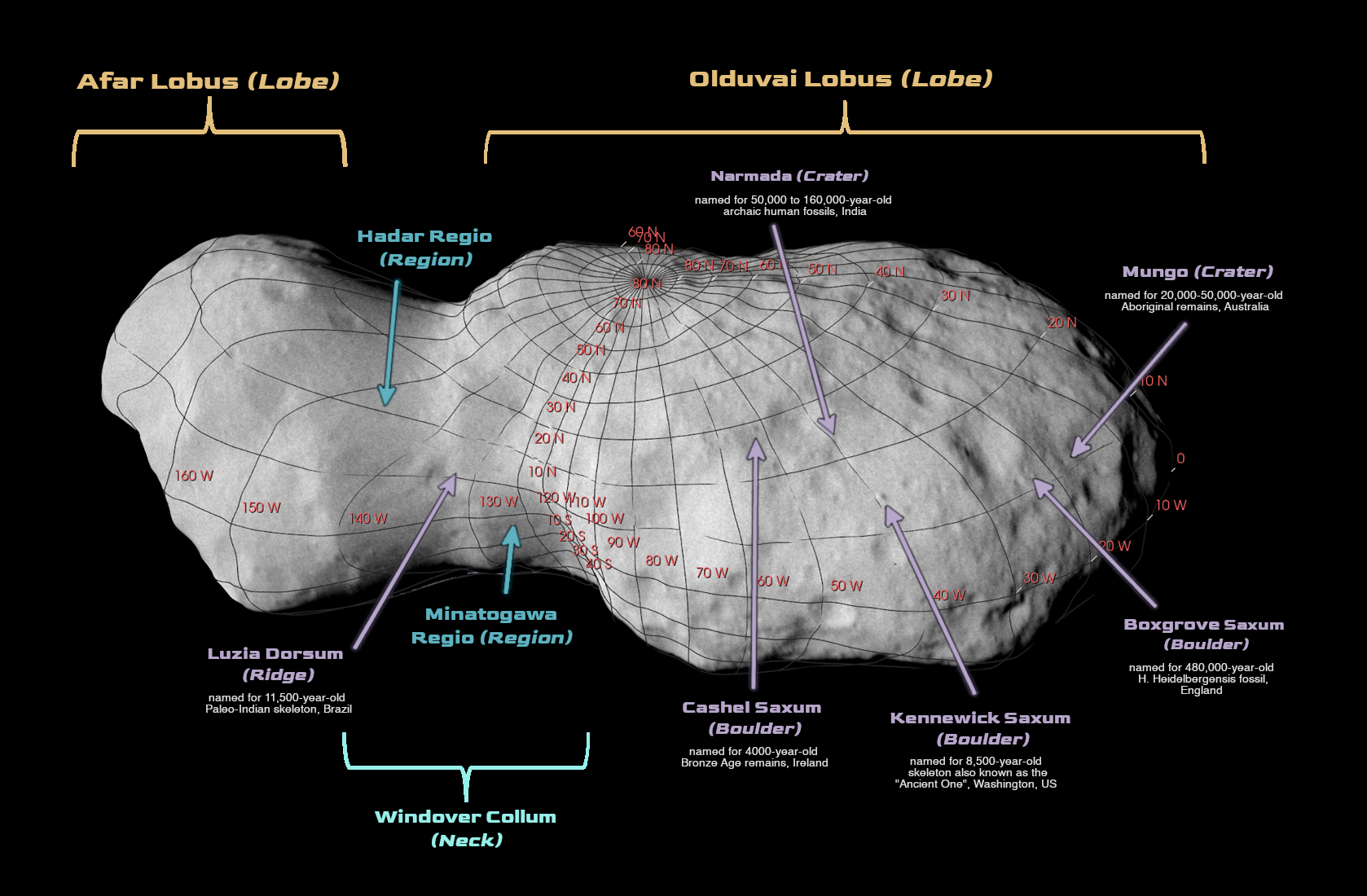
Model of Donaldjohanson with officially named geological features labeled

Donaldjohanson is an elongated contact binary asteroid. It consists of two lobes connected by a smooth, narrow neck, giving it a peanut-shaped appearance. The asteroid has overall dimensions of 8.8 km × 4.4 km × 3.1 km (5.5 mi × 2.7 mi × 1.9 mi) and a volume of approximately 58 km^{3} (14 mi^{3}). Its mass has not been measured directly. Assuming it has a density of 1.2 g/cm^{3} similar to those of carbonaceous asteroids Bennu and Ryugu, Donaldjohanson is estimated to have a mass of 7×10^{13} kg. Its surface is estimated to have a cohesive strength of up to 40,000 pascals, probably much higher than those of loosely-bound rubble pile asteroids like Bennu and Ryugu (cohesive strengths <100 Pa).

Only 40% of Donaldjohanson's surface has been imaged in detail by Lucy. The International Astronomical Union (IAU) and the Lucy team have given formal names to several geological features on the asteroid, in honor of significant paleoanthropological sites and hominin discoveries. Named features include boulders (saxa), craters, and ridges (dorsa). The first eleven of these names were approved by the IAU on 27 August 2025.

==== Lobes ====
The smaller lobe of Donaldjohanson is named Afar Lobus, after the Afar Triangle in Ethiopia, while the larger lobe is named Olduvai Lobus, after Olduvai Gorge in Tanzania. Afar Lobus has a length of about 3.4 km (2.1 mi), whereas Olduvai Lobus has a length of about 5.4 km (3.4 mi). Because Olduvai Lobus is larger, the entire asteroid's center of mass lies inside it. The lobes are thought to be former individual asteroids that formed together, gravitated toward each other, and then merged gently.

Both lobes are heavily covered with impact craters. The largest known crater on Afar Lobus has a diameter between 0.8 and 0.9 km (0.50 and 0.56 mi), whereas Olduvai Lobus's largest known crater has a diameter between 2 and 3 km (1.2 and 1.9 mi). The number density of craters larger than 400 m (1,300 ft) appears to have reached a steady state where it remains nearly constant over time. (Note: Any impact would, on average, destroy one older crater and leave a new one.) In contrast, craters with diameters smaller than 400 m appear scarcer on both lobes. Crater counts indicate that small craters were erased within the last 40 million years. The Lucy team proposed that they were erased by the flow of loose material, when a large impact event triggered seismic shaking across Donaldjohanson's surface.

==== Neck ====
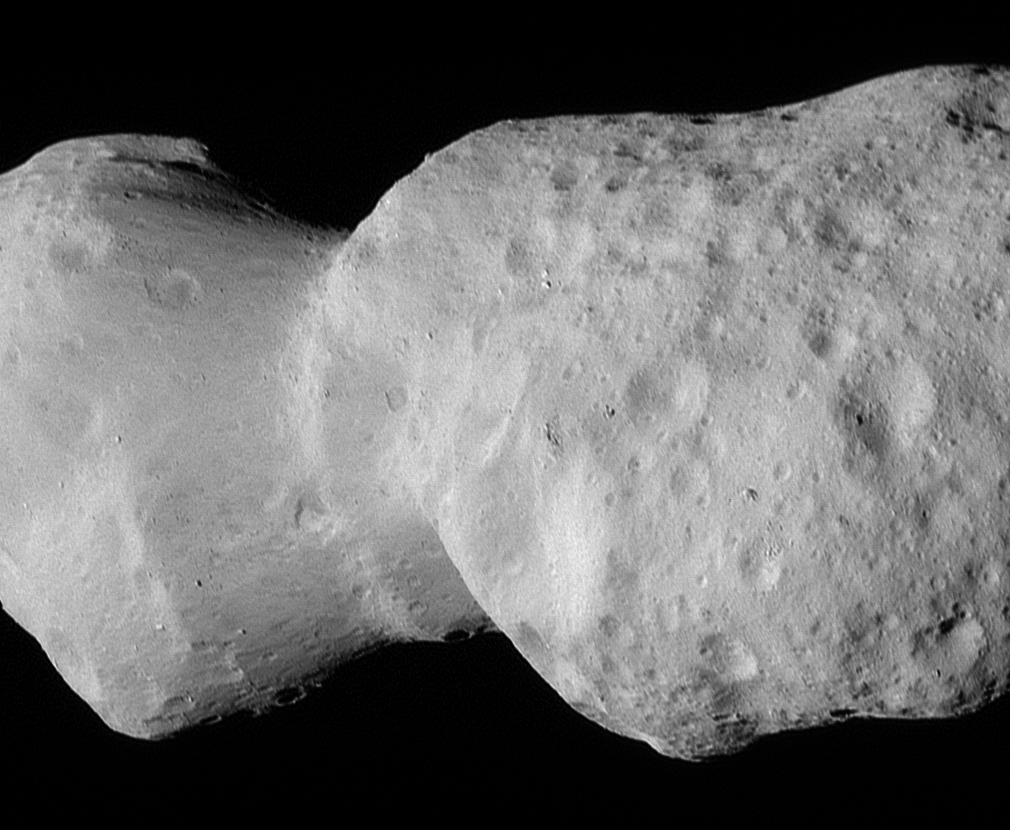
Donaldjohanson photographed by Lucy at a range of 1,100 km (684 mi), roughly 40 seconds before closest approach

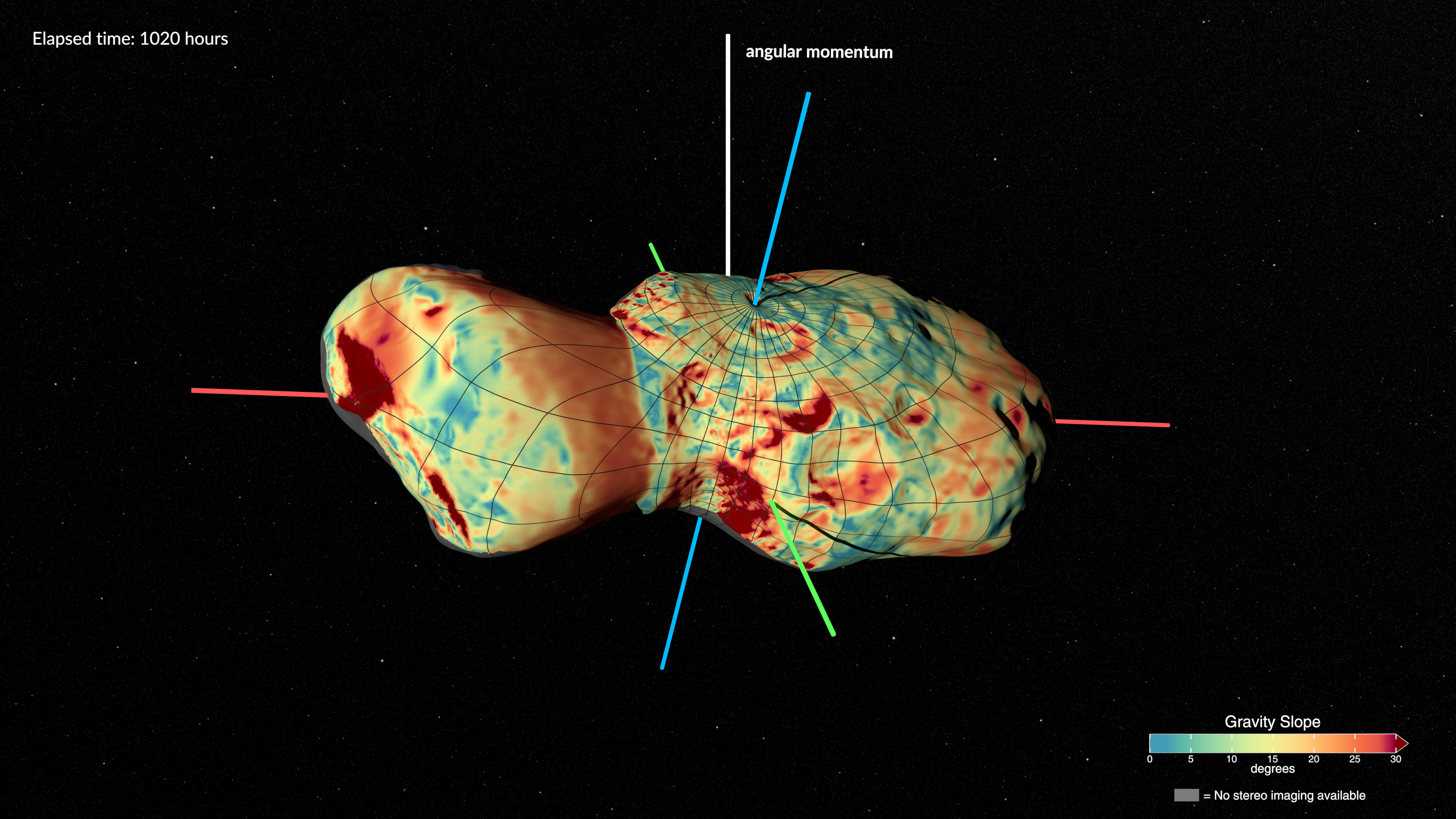
3D model of Donaldjohanson, color coded by slope angle. Steep (red) terrain is commonly found at the neck (Windover Collum) and at the rims of craters.

The neck connecting the two lobes is named Windover Collum, after the Windover Archeological Site in Florida. The middle of Windover Collum is encircled by a ridge named Luzia Dorsum (named after the Luzia Woman), which divides the neck into a larger Hadar Regio at Afar Lobus and a smaller Minatogawa Regio at Olduvai Lobus (named after Hadar, Ethiopia and the Minatogawa Man, respectively). Due to the ridged appearance of Windover Collum, researchers of the Lucy team have compared Donaldjohanson's shape to that of an hourglass, or a pair of nested ice cream cones.

At Windover Collum, the surface gravity points toward Donaldjohanson's center of mass at Olduvai Lobus, so loose material is expected to preferentially slide downward from Afar Lobus to Olduvai Lobus. This is evident from the smooth terrain seen in Hadar Regio, which is sparsely covered by degraded and typically flat-floored craters. The slope is also steep and uniform, with an average angle of 25° with respect to the direction of Donaldjohanson's surface gravity. The side of Luzia Dorsum facing Afar Lobus has a shallow slope of less than 10°, which indicates that material has accumulated there. These characteristics of Windover Collum suggest that it has undergone resurfacing relatively recently, less than 20 million years ago, most likely as a result of landslides triggered by large impact events.

==== Other features ====
One boulder (Boxgrove Saxum) and two small craters (Mungo and Narmada) were named in August 2025 with the purpose of defining Donaldjohanson's prime meridian. They were selected as coordinate markers because they were identified as the smallest and most visible features in Lucy's close-up photographs of Donaldjohanson. Two other larger boulders, Cashel Saxum and Kennewick Saxum (diameters 80 and 100 m or 260 and 330 ft, respectively), have also been named. All named boulders and craters are located on Olduvai Lobus.

=== Rotation ===
Simulation showing Donaldjohanson's tumbling rotation over a duration of 1,020 hours (43 days)

Animation illustrating how Donaldjohanson changes brightness as it rotates, as shown in its light curve

Donaldjohanson exhibits a very slow, tumbling rotation, known as non-principal axis rotation. Instead of rotating about a fixed axis, it wobbles chaotically without ever exactly repeating its orientation. The asteroid wobbles around its long axis with a roll precession period of 637.0 hours (26.54 days) and wobbles around its angular momentum vector with a yaw precession period of 180.7 hours (7.53 days). The asteroid's short axis is not aligned with the angular momentum vector and can stray as far as 40° away from it. These two precession periods make Donaldjohanson rotate end-over-end with a primary period of 252.6 ± 0.4 hours (10.525 ± 0.017 days). Observations by the Lucy spacecraft indicate that Donaldjohanson also displays a secondary rotation period of 455.2 ± 0.9 hours (18.967 ± 0.038 days).

Due to Donaldjohanson's elongated shape, its apparent brightness varies greatly as it rotates. Astronomers first reported Donaldjohanson's slow rotation in 2021, after ground-based telescopes detected periodic brightness variations ranging approximately 1 magnitude. The Lucy spacecraft confirmed these results and discovered the asteroid's tumbling rotation while monitoring its brightness over the two months leading up to its encounter.

The obliquity of Donaldjohanson's angular momentum vector is about 5 degrees with respect to the asteroid's orbital plane. This makes Donaldjohanson a prograde rotator, meaning it rotates in the same direction as its orbit around the Sun. The asteroid's slow, tumbling rotation is an expected outcome of the YORP effect, which is known to occur in kilometer-sized asteroids. The YORP effect involves an irregularly-shaped asteroid absorbing sunlight and asymmetrically radiating it away in infrared, which produces a slight torque that gradually alters the asteroid's rotation. For Donaldjohanson, the YORP effect is believed to have slowed down its rotation.

Donaldjohanson is thought to have formed with an initially short rotation period between 5 and 10 hours. During this time, the centrifugal acceleration on the asteroid's surface was large enough to keep steep slopes stable against surface gravity, but not too large to cause material to flow opposite to gravity. Simulations by the Lucy team suggest that the YORP effect slowed the asteroid's rotation down to a period of 10 hours within 20 to 60 million years. By that point, centrifugal acceleration became weaker than gravity, so steep slopes collapsed and formed the asteroid's smooth neck terrain. The simulations also suggested that Donaldjohanson began tumbling 120 to 130 million years after its formation, and continued slowing down to its present-day rotation. If left undisturbed by outside forces like YORP or impacts, the asteroid is predicted to continue tumbling for about 20 billion years before it stabilizes to a fixed rotation axis. However, the Lucy team notes that this timeline of Donaldjohanson's rotation may not be fully accurate.

=== Surface composition ===
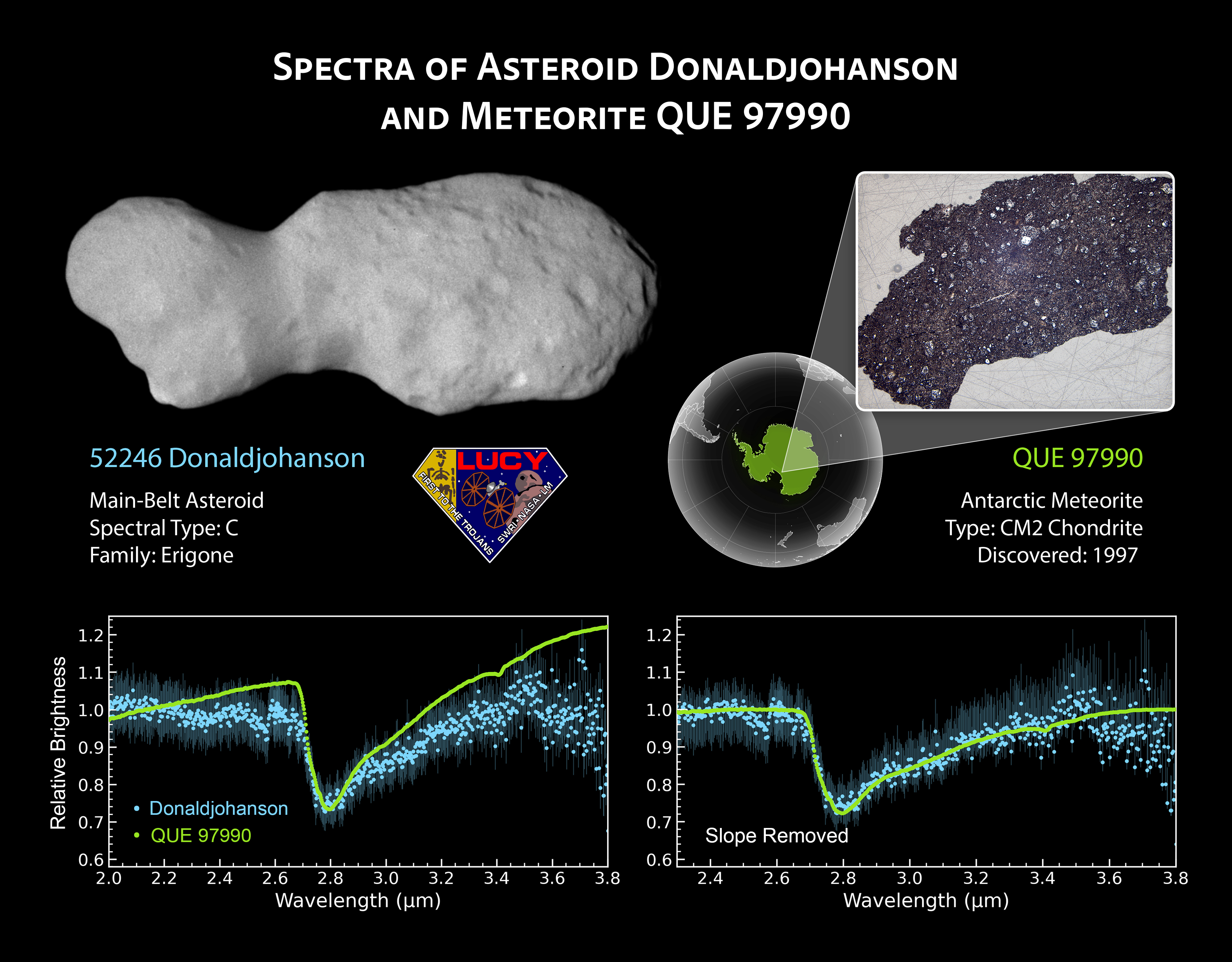
Donaldjohanson's near-infrared spectrum is similar to that of a CM chondrite meteorite, which indicates they share similar compositions.

Spectroscopic observations by Lucy and telescopes on Earth have shown that Donaldjohanson is a C-type asteroid, (Note: Studies from 2020 and 2026 suggested that Donaldjohanson could be classified as a Cg-type asteroid because it apparently lacked the 0.7 μm absorption band. However, a later paper by the Lucy team contradicted this, finding that the asteroid does display absorption at 0.7 μm.) meaning it has a dark surface made of carbonaceous chondrite-like minerals. In visible light, the asteroid has a geometric albedo of about 5%. The asteroid preferentially absorbs light at wavelengths of 0.7 and 2.8 μm, indicating that its surface contains iron-rich phyllosilicate minerals, most similar to those found in CM chondrite meteorites. These phyllosilicates, known as clays, contain hydroxyl groups (−OH) which indicate that they have been altered by liquid water in the past, possibly before Donaldjohanson split from its parent asteroid. The exposure must have been brief, however, as iron in clays tends to be replaced with other elements as water lingers. This contrasts with other C-type asteroids such as Bennu and Ryugu, which underwent greater liquid water exposure as hinted by their iron-poor clays.

== Search for moons and cometary activity ==
The Lucy spacecraft found no signs of cometary activity and moons during its close encounter with Donaldjohanson. The Lucy team has ruled out the existence of moons larger than 15 m (49 ft) in diameter throughout the asteroid's 700 km (430 mi)-diameter Hill sphere.

== Origin ==
Donaldjohanson is a member of the Erigone family, a collisional family of C-type inner main-belt asteroids sharing similar physical and orbital properties as their namesake 163 Erigone. The Erigone family is believed to have formed from the destruction of an 80 km (50 mi)-diameter parent asteroid due to a collision with a 20 km (12 mi)-diameter asteroid. Based on the orbital distribution of Erigone family members, it is estimated that the Erigone family formed within the last 270 million years, most likely around 155 million years ago. This makes the Erigone family relatively young compared to other asteroid families. The crater record on Donaldjohanson supports its membership of the Erigone family, showing that it must be no older than the family's age.

Donaldjohanson presumably formed as a comoving pair of kilometer-sized fragments ejected from its destroyed parent. These fragments gravitated toward each other and eventually merged gently, forming a rapidly-rotating contact binary with a period of a few hours. Over millions of years, the asteroid's surface accumulated craters from impacts and its rotation grew slower due to the YORP effect, leading to its present-day surface features. During this time, the asteroid's orbit had also drifted slightly farther away from the Sun due to the Yarkovsky effect.

== See also ==
- List of minor planets and comets visited by spacecraft
  - 152830 Dinkinesh – first asteroid visited by Lucy before Donaldjohanson (2023)
  - 3548 Eurybates – the next asteroid to be visited by Lucy after Donaldjohanson (2027)
- List of slow rotators (minor planets)
- List of tumblers (small Solar System bodies)
  - 253 Mathilde – a slowly-rotating C-type main-belt asteroid visited by the NEAR Shoemaker mission in 1997
  - 4179 Toutatis – a slowly-tumbling contact binary near-Earth asteroid visited by the Chang'e 2 mission in 2012
