= 1264 Letaba =

Carbonaceous asteroid

Discovery
- Discovered by: C. Jackson
- Discovery site: Johannesburg Obs.
- Discovery date: 21 April 1933

Designations
- Named after: Letaba River (South African river)
- Alternative designations: 1933 HG · 1930 WC; 1954 YB · 1962 HJ; 1964 VB
- Minor planet category: main-belt · (outer) background

Orbital characteristics
- Epoch 4 September 2017 (JD 2458000.5)
- Uncertainty parameter 0
- Observation arc: 84.54 yr (30,877 days)
- Aphelion: 3.3108 AU
- Perihelion: 2.4225 AU
- Semi-major axis: 2.8667 AU
- Eccentricity: 0.1549
- Orbital period (sidereal): 4.85 yr (1,773 days)
- Mean anomaly: 112.30°
- Mean motion: 0° 12^{m} 11.16^{s} / day
- Inclination: 24.953°
- Longitude of ascending node: 235.05°
- Argument of perihelion: 31.529°

Physical characteristics
- Dimensions: 66.040±0.405 km 67.76±17.00 km 67.79±17.67 km 70.180±23.32 km 70.34±0.77 km 73.629±0.870 km 74.35 km (derived); 74.74±2.1 km
- Synodic rotation period: 12 h 16 h 32.16±0.03 h 32.74±0.02 h (best); 33.27±0.01 h 63.74±0.01 h
- Geometric albedo: 0.0407±0.0432; 0.0462 (derived); 0.05±0.07; 0.05±0.09; 0.0725±0.004; 0.0746±0.0114; 0.082±0.002; 0.093±0.027
- Spectral type: SMASS = C
- Absolute magnitude (H): 9.10 · 9.60 · 9.67 · 9.70 · 9.87±0.22

1264 Letaba, provisional designation 1933 HG, is a carbonaceous asteroid and possible tumbler from the background population of the outer asteroid belt, approximately 70 kilometers in diameter. It was discovered on 21 April 1933, by South African astronomer Cyril Jackson at the Union Observatory in Johannesburg. The asteroid was named for the Letaba River in eastern South Africa.

== Orbit and classification ==
Letaba is a non-family asteroid of the main belt's background population. It orbits the Sun in the outer asteroid belt at a distance of 2.4–3.3 AU once every 4 years and 10 months (1,773 days; semi-major axis of 2.87 AU). Its orbit has an eccentricity of 0.15 and an inclination of 25° with respect to the ecliptic.

The asteroid was first identified as 1930 WC at Simeiz Observatory in November 1930. The body's observation arc begins at Johannesburg, the night before its official discovery observation.

== Physical characteristics ==
In the SMASS classification, Letaba is a carbonaceous C-type asteroid.

=== Rotation period ===
Several rotational lightcurves of Letaba have been obtained from photometric observations since 2002. The best-rated lightcurve was measured by the Spanish amateur astronomer group OBAS in July 2016. It gave a longer-than average rotation period of 32.74 hours with a brightness variation of 0.28 magnitude (U=3). It might be a tumbler due to the lightcurve's inconsistent slope segments (T?). Based on its current diameter estimate, Letaba would be the second-largest tumbler just behind the Hildian asteroid 1512 Oulu (see List of tumblers).

=== Diameter and albedo ===
According to the surveys carried out by the Infrared Astronomical Satellite IRAS, the Japanese Akari satellite and the NEOWISE mission of NASA's Wide-field Infrared Survey Explorer, Letaba measures between 66.040 and 74.74 kilometers in diameter and its surface has an albedo between 0.0407 and 0.093.

The Collaborative Asteroid Lightcurve Link derives an albedo of 0.0462 and a diameter of 74.35 kilometers based on an absolute magnitude of 9.6.

== Naming ==
This minor planet was named after the Letaba River, located in eastern South Africa. The official naming citation was mentioned in The Names of the Minor Planets by Paul Herget in 1955 (H 116).
