= 2672 Písek =

Main-belt asteroid

Discovery
- Discovered by: J. Kveton
- Discovery site: Kleť Obs.
- Discovery date: 31 May 1979

Designations
- Named after: Písek (Czech town)
- Alternative designations: 1979 KC · 1937 NP; 1953 EJ_{1} · 1953 ET_{1} 1978 EF_{1}
- Minor planet category: main-belt · (middle); Eunomia

Orbital characteristics
- Epoch 23 March 2018 (JD 2458200.5)
- Uncertainty parameter 0
- Observation arc: 64.64 yr (23,609 d)
- Aphelion: 3.0006 AU
- Perihelion: 2.2257 AU
- Semi-major axis: 2.6132 AU
- Eccentricity: 0.1483
- Orbital period (sidereal): 4.22 yr (1,543 d)
- Mean anomaly: 44.692°
- Mean motion: 0° 13^{m} 59.88^{s} / day
- Inclination: 14.139°
- Longitude of ascending node: 129.02°
- Argument of perihelion: 152.35°

Physical characteristics
- Mean diameter: 20.18±0.8 km 22.624±0.786 km 26.45±0.77 km 29.594±7.961 km
- Synodic rotation period: 831±3 h
- Geometric albedo: 0.0294±0.0261; 0.045±0.008; 0.053±0.003; 0.0907±0.008
- Spectral type: S (assumed)
- Absolute magnitude (H): 11.70; 12.20; 12.4; 12.41

2672 Písek, provisional designation 1979 KC, is a Eunomia asteroid from the central regions of the asteroid belt, approximately 25 kilometers (16 miles) in diameter. It was discovered on 31 May 1979, by Yugoslav astronomer Jaroslav Květoň at the Kleť Observatory in the Czech Republic. The likely elongated asteroid is a suspected tumbler and a slow rotator with an exceptionally long period of 831 hours. It was named after the Czech town of Písek.

== Orbit and classification ==
Písek is a core member of the Eunomia family (502), a prominent family of stony S-type asteroid and the largest one in the intermediate main belt with more than 5,000 members. It orbits the Sun in the central main-belt at a distance of 2.2–3.0 AU once every 4 years and 3 months (1,543 days; semi-major axis of 2.61 AU). Its orbit has an eccentricity of 0.15 and an inclination of 14° with respect to the ecliptic.

The asteroid was first observed as 1937 NP at Johannesburg Observatory in July 1937. The body's observation arc begins with its observation as 1953 EJ_{1} at Goethe Link Observatory in March 1953, more than 26 years prior to its official discovery observation at Klet.

== Naming ==
This minor planet was named after the Czech town of Písek, located in the western South Bohemian Region known for its many prolific Czech writers and artists. The official naming citation was published by the Minor Planet Center on 28 January 1983 (M.P.C. 7620).

== Physical characteristics ==
Písek is an assumed S-type asteroid, which agrees with the overall spectral type for members of the Eunomia family. Conversely, the space-based surveys found an albedo that is typical for a carbonaceous C-type or potentially darker D- and P-type asteroid (see below).

=== Rotation period ===
Between May and July 2017, a rotational lightcurve of Písek was obtained from photometric observations by Vladimir Benishek at Belgrade Astronomical Observatory in Serbia. Lightcurve analysis gave a rotation period of 831±3 hours with a high brightness amplitude of 0.90 magnitude, indicative of a non-spherical shape (U=2+).

=== Diameter and albedo ===
According to the survey carried out by the Infrared Astronomical Satellite IRAS, the Japanese Akari satellite, and the NEOWISE mission of NASA's Wide-field Infrared Survey Explorer, Písek measures between 20.18 and 29.60 kilometers in diameter and its surface has an albedo between 0.0294 and 0.091.

The Collaborative Asteroid Lightcurve Link assumes a standard albedo of 0.21 – derived from 15 Eunomia, the parent body of the Eunomia family– and consequently calculates a much smaller diameter of 9.60 kilometers based on an absolute magnitude of 12.4.
