= 1479 Inkeri =

Main-belt asteroid

Discovery
- Discovered by: Y. Väisälä
- Discovery site: Turku Obs.
- Discovery date: 16 February 1938

Designations
- Named after: Ingria (former Finnish province) (discoverer's family members)
- Alternative designations: 1938 DE · 1934 FR; 1956 JD · A916 AC; A923 RG
- Minor planet category: main-belt · (middle) background

Orbital characteristics
- Epoch 4 September 2017 (JD 2458000.5)
- Uncertainty parameter 0
- Observation arc: 93.63 yr (34,199 days)
- Aphelion: 3.1920 AU
- Perihelion: 2.1636 AU
- Semi-major axis: 2.6778 AU
- Eccentricity: 0.1920
- Orbital period (sidereal): 4.38 yr (1,601 days)
- Mean anomaly: 91.083°
- Mean motion: 0° 13^{m} 29.64^{s} / day
- Inclination: 7.3024°
- Longitude of ascending node: 18.110°
- Argument of perihelion: 80.004°

Physical characteristics
- Dimensions: 15.206±0.117 km 18.35 km (calculated); 18.83±5.10 km 22.70±0.56 km 31.86±0.33 km
- Synodic rotation period: 5 h (dated); 12.55 h (dated); 660±5 h
- Geometric albedo: 0.033±0.006; 0.07±0.06; 0.095±0.005; 0.10 (assumed); 0.222±0.003
- Spectral type: Tholen = XFU; B–V = 0.699
- Absolute magnitude (H): 11.40 · 11.80 · 11.9 · 12.00 · 12.45±1.49

1479 Inkeri, provisional designation 1938 DE, is an asteroid from the central regions of the asteroid belt. It is an exceptionally slow rotator, suspected tumbler and measures approximately 19 kilometers in diameter. It was discovered on 16 February 1938, by Finnish astronomer Yrjö Väisälä at the Iso-Heikkilä Observatory in Turku, Finland. "Inkeri" is the name of two of the discoverer's younger relatives as well as the local name of the former Finnish province of Ingria.

== Orbit and classification ==
Inkeri is a non-family asteroid from the main belt's background population. It orbits the Sun in the central asteroid belt at a distance of 2.2–3.2 AU once every 4 years and 5 months (1,601 days). Its orbit has an eccentricity of 0.19 and an inclination of 7° with respect to the ecliptic.

The asteroid was first identified as A916 AC at Simeiz Observatory in January 1916. The body's observation arc begins with its identification as 1923 RG at Heidelberg Observatory in September 1923, more than 14 years prior to its official discovery observation at Turku.

== Physical characteristics ==
In the Tholen classification, Inkeri's spectral type is ambiguous (XFU). It is closest to that of an X-type asteroid and somewhat similar to the F-types. In addition, the spectrum has also been flagged as "unusual" (U).

=== Slow rotator and tumbler ===
In December 2011, a rotational lightcurve of Inkeri was obtained from photometric observations by Andrea Ferrero at the Bigmuskie Observatory (B88), Italy, in collaboration with Frederick Pilcher at the Organ Mesa Observatory (G50) in New Mexico, United States. Analysis of the bimodal lightcurve gave an exceptionally long rotation period of 660 hours with a brightness amplitude of 1.30 magnitude (U=2+).

This makes it one of the slowest rotators known to exist. The observers also suspect that the body is a tumbling asteroid in a non-principal axis rotation. These results supersede previous period solutions of 5 and 12.55 hours (U=1/1).

=== Diameter and albedo ===
According to the surveys carried out by the Japanese Akari satellite and the NEOWISE mission of NASA's Wide-field Infrared Survey Explorer, Inkeri measures between 15.206 and 31.86 kilometers in diameter and its surface has an albedo between 0.033 and 0.2222.

The Collaborative Asteroid Lightcurve Link assumes an albedo of 0.10 and calculates a diameter of 18.35 kilometers based on an absolute magnitude of 11.8.

== Naming ==
This minor planet was named "Inkeri", a Finnish female name, held by Vaisala's granddaughter and niece. It is also the Finnish name of Ingria, a formerly-Finnish province near Saint Petersburg that is now part of Russia. The official naming citation was published by the Minor Planet Center in January 1956 (M.P.C. 1350).
