= (467336) 2002 LT38 =

Near-Earth asteroid

(467336) 2002 LT_{38}
Discovery
- Discovered by: LINEAR
- Discovery site: Lincoln Lab's ETS
- Discovery date: 12 June 2002

Designations
- Minor planet category: NEO · Aten · PHA

Orbital characteristics
- Epoch 23 March 2018 (JD 2458200.5)
- Uncertainty parameter 0
- Observation arc: 14.09 yr (5,148 days)
- Aphelion: 1.1103 AU
- Perihelion: 0.5799 AU
- Semi-major axis: 0.8451 AU
- Eccentricity: 0.3138
- Orbital period (sidereal): 0.78 yr (284 days)
- Mean anomaly: 316.03°
- Mean motion: 1° 16^{m} 7.32^{s} / day
- Inclination: 6.1959°
- Longitude of ascending node: 259.41°
- Argument of perihelion: 162.73°
- Earth MOID: 0.0344 AU (13.4 LD)

Physical characteristics
- Mean diameter: 0.236 km (calculated); 0.240 km (est. at 0.20)
- Synodic rotation period: 21.80±0.05 h (Note: Lightcurve plot of (467336) 2002 LT_{38} by Brian Warner, Palmer Divide Station, California (2016). Rotation period 21.80±0.05 hours with a brightness amplitude of 1.16±0.05 mag. Quality Code of 2+. Summary figures at the LCDB. Observers comment: "There may be some indications of tumbling in the lightcurve, for example, the 'break' in the Fourier curve around 0.45 rotation phase".)
- Geometric albedo: 0.20 (assumed)
- Spectral type: S (assumed)
- Absolute magnitude (H): 20.5

(467336) 2002 LT_{38} is a sub-kilometer asteroid and suspected tumbler, classified as a near-Earth object and potentially hazardous asteroid of the Aten group, approximately 240 meters (790 ft) in diameter. It was discovered on 12 June 2002, by astronomers of the Lincoln Near-Earth Asteroid Research at the Lincoln Laboratory's Experimental Test Site near Socorro, New Mexico, in the United States.

== Orbit and classification ==
2002 LT_{38} orbits the Sun at a distance of 0.6–1.1 AU once every 9 months (284 days; semi-major axis of 0.85 AU). Its orbit has an eccentricity of 0.31 and an inclination of 6° with respect to the ecliptic.

The body's observation arc begins with a precovery taken at AMOS on 10 June 2002, two nights prior to its official discovery observation at Lincoln Lab's ETS.

=== Close approaches ===
2002 LT_{38} has an Earth minimum orbital intersection distance of 0.0344 AU (5,150,000 km) which corresponds to 13.4 lunar distances. It will pass at that distance during its close encounter with Earth on 27 June 2030.

Earth Approaches on 24 June 2023 and 27 June 2030
Date	JPL Horizons nominal geocentric distance (AU)	uncertainty region (3-sigma)
2023-Jun-24 18:28	0.04450 AU (6.657 million km)	±31 km
2030-Jun-27 23:13	0.03447 AU (5.157 million km)	±23 km

== Physical characteristics ==
The asteroid is an assumed stony S-type asteroid.

=== Rotation period ===
In July 2016, a first rotational lightcurve of 2002 LT_{38} was obtained from photometric observations by American astronomer Brian Warner at his Palmer Divide Station in California (U82). Lightcurve analysis gave a longer-than average rotation period of 21.80 hours with a brightness variation of 1.16 magnitude (U=2+). A high brightness amplitude typically indicates that the body has a non-spherical, elongated shape. It is also a suspected tumbler.

=== Diameter and albedo ===
The Collaborative Asteroid Lightcurve Link assumes a standard albedo for stony asteroids of 0.20 and calculates a diameter of 0.236 kilometers based on an absolute magnitude of 20.5.

== Numbering and naming ==
This minor planet was numbered by the Minor Planet Center on 21 May 2016, after its orbit determination became sufficiently secure (M.P.C. 100286). As of 2018, it has not been named.
