= (86039) 1999 NC43 =

Asteroid

(86039) 1999 NC_{43}
Discovery
- Discovered by: LINEAR
- Discovery site: Lincoln Lab's ETS
- Discovery date: 14 July 1999

Designations
- Minor planet category: Apollo · NEO · PHA

Orbital characteristics
- Epoch 4 September 2017 (JD 2458000.5)
- Uncertainty parameter 0
- Observation arc: 15.04 yr (5,492 days)
- Aphelion: 2.7785 AU
- Perihelion: 0.7400 AU
- Semi-major axis: 1.7593 AU
- Eccentricity: 0.5794
- Orbital period (sidereal): 2.33 yr (852 days)
- Mean anomaly: 199.72°
- Mean motion: 0° 25^{m} 20.64^{s} / day
- Inclination: 7.1239°
- Longitude of ascending node: 311.76°
- Argument of perihelion: 120.61°
- Earth MOID: 0.0243 AU · 9.5 LD

Physical characteristics
- Mean diameter: 1.43±0.07 km 2.22 km
- Synodic rotation period: 34.29±0.06 h 34.49±0.18 h (Note: Pravec (2000) web: rotation period 34.49±0.18 hours with a brightness amplitude of 1.1 mag. Summary figures at Collaborative Asteroid Lightcurve Link (CALL) for (86039))
- Geometric albedo: 0.13; 0.14; 0.352±0.039
- Spectral type: SMASS = Q
- Absolute magnitude (H): 16.0 · 16.08 · 16.1

(86039) 1999 NC_{43} is an asteroid on an eccentric orbit, classified as a near-Earth object and potentially hazardous asteroid of the Apollo group, approximately 2 kilometers in diameter. This suspected tumbler and relatively slow rotator was discovered by LINEAR in 1999.

== Discovery ==
The asteroid was discovered on 14 July 1999, by the Lincoln Near-Earth Asteroid Research (LINEAR) team at Lincoln Laboratory's Experimental Test Site, near Socorro, New Mexico, USA, at an apparent magnitude of 18, using a 1.0-meter reflector.

Its first observation was made by the Catalina Sky Survey in June 1999, extending the asteroid's observation arc by one month prior to its official discovery observation.

== Orbit and classification ==
1999 NC_{43} has a well-determined orbit with an uncertainty of 0. The body orbits the Sun at a distance of 0.7–2.8 AU once every 2 years and 4 months (852 days). Its orbit has an eccentricity of 0.58 and an inclination of 7° with respect to the ecliptic. Its Earth minimum orbit intersection distance is 0.0243 AU (3,640,000 km), which corresponds to 9.5 lunar distances. Its most notable close approach to Earth will be on 14 February 2173 at a distance of 0.03361 AU (5,028,000 km). The asteroid also makes close approaches to Venus and Mars.

== Physical characteristics ==
The rare Q-type asteroid is one of only 20 characterized bodies of this spectral type in the SMASS taxonomic scheme.

=== Rotation period ===
Several rotational lightcurves were obtained from photometric observations by Czech astronomer Petr Pravec at Ondřejov Observatory and American astronomer Brian Warner at his private Palmer Divide Observatory, Colorado. Best rated results gave a rotation period of 34.49±0.18 hours with an exceptionally high brightness variation of 1.1 magnitude (U=n.a.). Pravec's alternative period of 122 hours was later not supported by Warner. However, there are still other periods possible due to sparse photometric data points. The asteroid is also suspected to be in a tumbling motion, which makes the determination of its period more complex. For an asteroid of its size, it is a relatively slow rotator.

=== Diameter and albedo ===
According to the survey carried out by the Japanese Akari satellite, the asteroid has a high albedo of 0.35 and a diameter of 1.43 kilometers. Observations by the Keck Observatory in the thermal infrared gave a refined albedo of 0.13–0.14 with a larger diameter of 2.22 kilometers.

=== Chelyabinsk meteor fragment ===
1999 NC_{43} is suspected to be related to the 20-meter Chelyabinsk meteor, which exploded as a bright fireball over Russia on 15 February 2013. Analysis showed similar orbits for both bodies and suggested that they were once part of the same object.

== Numbering and naming ==
This minor planet was numbered by the Minor Planet Center on 30 August 2004. As of 2018, it has not been named.
