= 319 Leona =

Main-belt asteroid

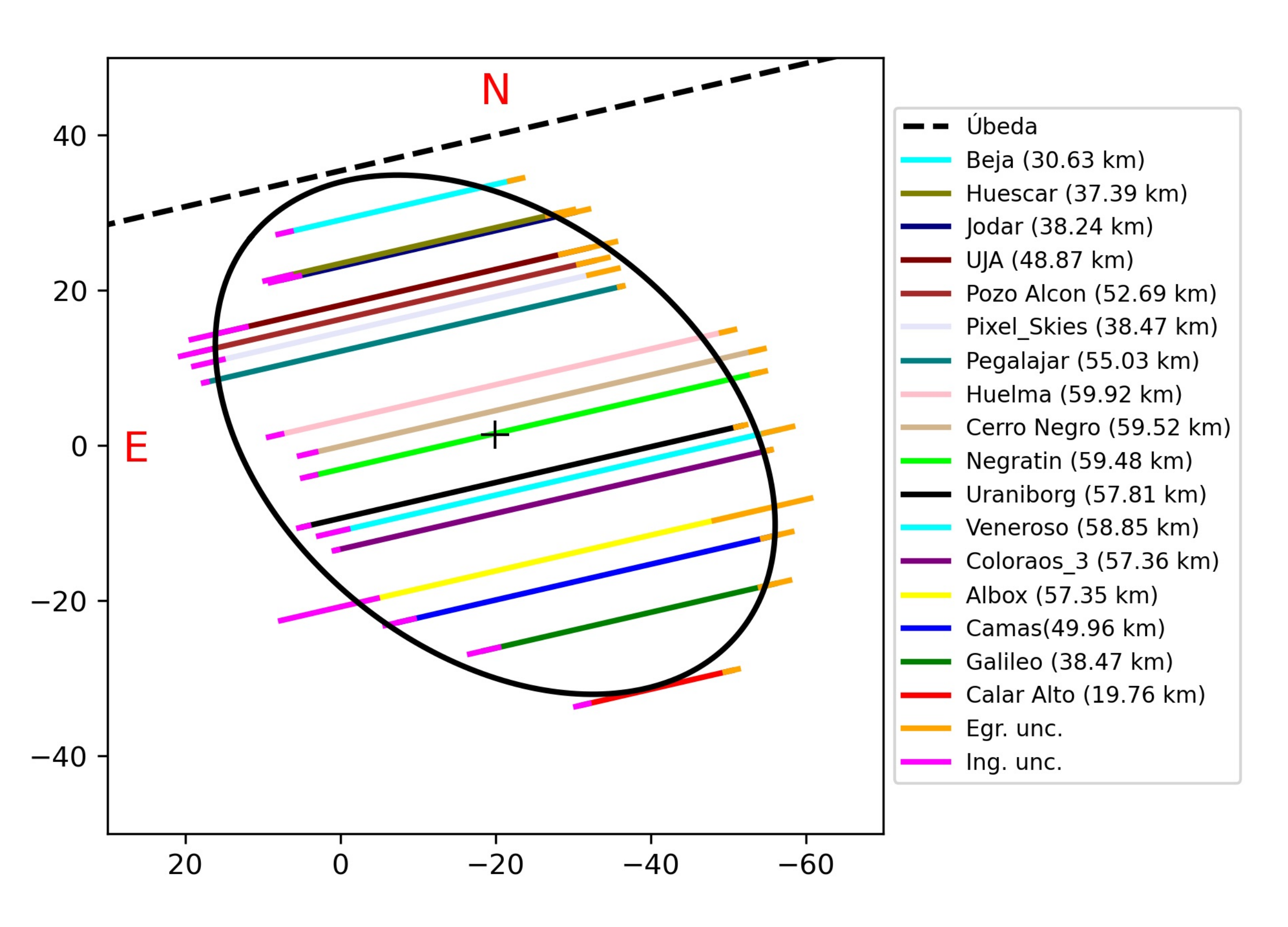
- The outline of Leona's shape revealed in a stellar occultation from 13 September 2023

Discovery
- Discovered by: A. Charlois
- Discovery site: Nice Obs.
- Discovery date: 8 October 1891

Designations
- Pronunciation: /liːˈoʊnə/
- Named after: unknown Leona
- Alternative designations: A920 HE
- Minor planet category: main-belt · (outer)

Orbital characteristics
- Epoch 4 September 2017 (JD 2458000.5)
- Uncertainty parameter 0
- Observation arc: 125.32 yr (45,774 days)
- Aphelion: 4.1451 AU
- Perihelion: 2.6655 AU
- Semi-major axis: 3.4053 AU
- Eccentricity: 0.2172
- Orbital period (sidereal): 6.28 yr (2,295 days)
- Mean anomaly: 21.414°
- Mean motion: 0° 9^{m} 24.48^{s} / day
- Inclination: 10.564°
- Longitude of ascending node: 184.95°
- Argument of perihelion: 228.27°

Physical characteristics
- Dimensions: 79.6 km × 54.8 km (± 2.2 km × 1.3 km)
- Mean diameter: 66±2 km
- Synodic rotation period: 430±2 h
- Geometric albedo: 0.085±0.005
- Spectral type: P · X · C
- Absolute magnitude (H): 10.21; 10.46±0.06

319 Leona (provisional designation A920 HE) is a dark, carbonaceous asteroid in the outer regions of the asteroid belt. It was discovered on 8 October 1891, by French astronomer Auguste Charlois at Nice Observatory in France. On 12 December 2023, Leona passed in front of the bright star Betelgeuse and occulted it, which caused the star to briefly dim as seen from Central America, Europe, and east Asia. This occultation was expected to reveal the shape of Leona and the surface of Betelgeuse in high detail.

== Classification and orbit ==
Leona orbits the Sun in the outer main-belt at a distance of 2.7–4.1 AU once every 6 years and 3 months (2,295 days). Its orbit has an eccentricity of 0.22 and an inclination of 11° with respect to the ecliptic.

== Physical characteristics ==
=== Spectral type ===
Leona has been characterized as a dark and reddish P-type asteroid by the Wide-field Infrared Survey Explorer (WISE), and as an X-type asteroid by Pan-STARRS photometric survey. The Collaborative Asteroid Lightcurve Link groups it to the carbonaceous C-type asteroids.

=== Slow rotator and tumbler ===
In October 2016, a rotational lightcurve of Leona was obtained from photometric observations by astronomers Frederick Pilcher (see naming cite for 1990 Pilcher) at Organ Mesa Observatory (G50), United States, Lorenzo Franco at Balzaretto Observatory (A81), Italy, and Petr Pravec at the Ondřejov Observatory, Czech Republic. Lightcurve analysis gave a well-defined rotation period of 430±2 hours with a brightness variation of 0.5 magnitude (U=3).

This makes Leona one of the Top 100 slowest rotators known to exist. The astronomers also detected a non-principal axis rotation seen in distinct rotational cycles in successive order. This tumbling also gives an alternative candidate period solution of 1084±10 hours, one of the longest periods ever measured. It is the third-largest tumbler known to exist (also see List of tumblers).

Previous observations of Leona gave a much shorter period between 6 and 15 hours, which demonstrates the intricacy when observing slow rotators, especially those with a tumbling motion. A detailed description of the procedure of the photometric measurement is given by Pilcher.

=== Diameter and albedo ===
According to the surveys carried out by the Japanese Akari satellite and the NEOWISE mission of NASA's WISE space-telescope, Leona measures between 49.943 and 89.00 kilometers in diameter and its surface has an albedo between 0.02 and 0.085. CALL derived an albedo of 0.0318 and a diameter of 67.97 kilometers based on an absolute magnitude of 10.2.

== Naming ==
The origin of this minor planet's name is unknown.

Among the many thousands of named minor planets, Leona is one of 120 asteroids for which no official naming citation has been published. All of these low-numbered asteroids have numbers between 164 Eva and 1514 Ricouxa and were discovered between 1876 and the 1930s, predominantly by astronomers Auguste Charlois, Johann Palisa, Max Wolf and Karl Reinmuth.

== 2023 occultation of Betelgeuse ==
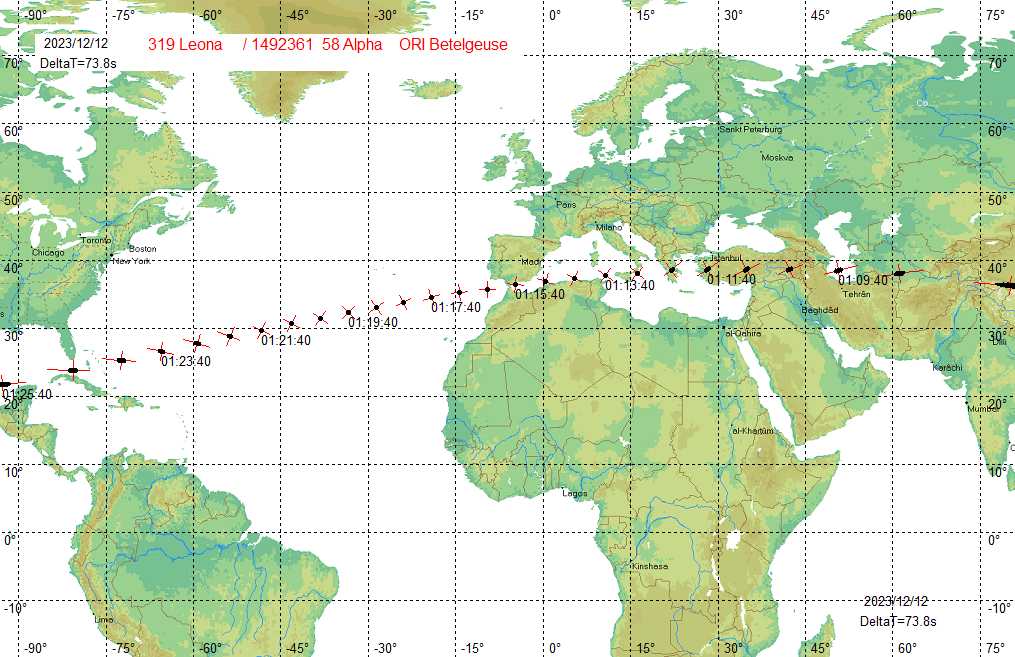
Predicted path of the occultation of Betelgeuse by (319) Leona on 12 December 2023, using the SOLEX software

On 12 December 2023 at about 01:09–01:27 UT, Leona occulted Betelgeuse as seen from southern Europe, Turkey, Greece and Sicily. The 14th magnitude asteroid was predicted to occult Betelgeuse approximately 12 seconds; Betelgeuse was expected to dim by about 3 magnitudes. The prediction was at first uncertain, visible on a very narrow path on Earth's surface, its width and location being uncertain due to lack of precise knowledge of the size and path of the asteroid). Projections were later refined as more data were analyzed for a totality of approximately five seconds on a 60 km wide path stretching from China, Tajikistan, Armenia, Turkey, Greece, Italy, Spain, the Atlantic Ocean, Miami, Florida and the Florida Keys to parts of Mexico. Among other programmes, 80 amateur astronomers in Europe were coordinated by astrophysicist Miguel Montargès, et al. of the Paris Observatory for the event. Light curve studies of the event was expected to help understand the distribution of brightness down to the granular level of Beltegeuse's convection cells, thus providing detailed data on the giant star heretofor inaccessible.

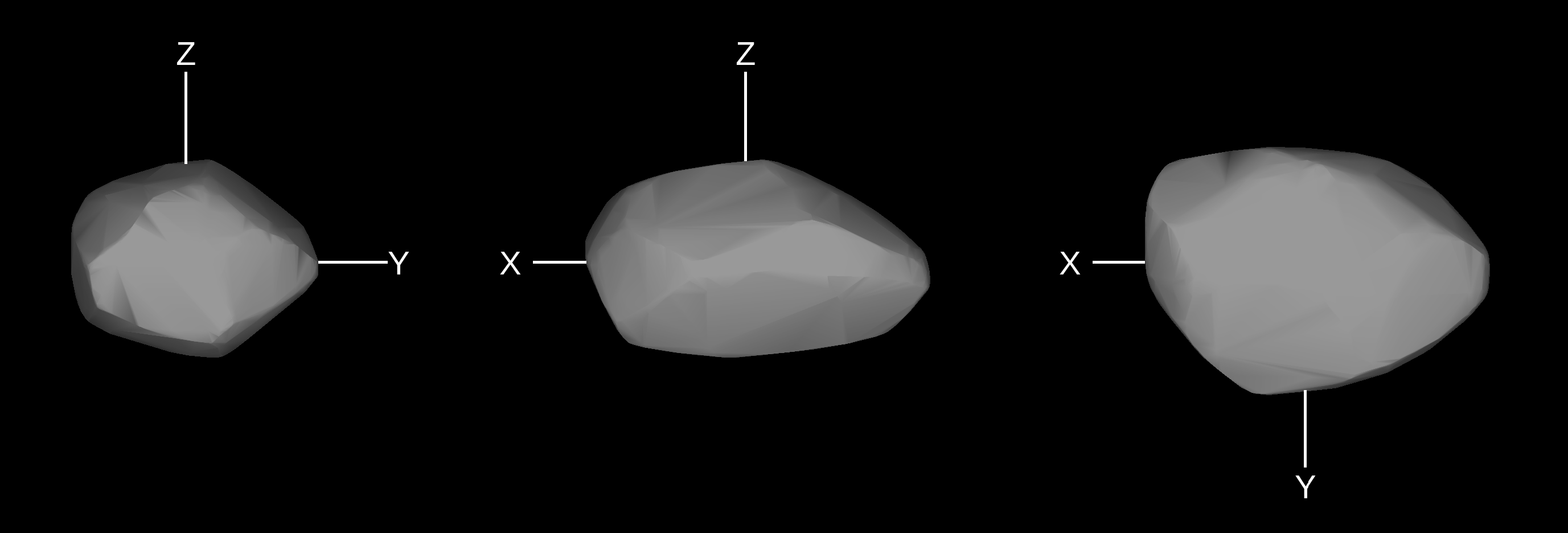
Lightcurve-base 3D-model of 319 Leona.

Observations of the earlier September 2023 occultation showed that the asteroid was slightly elliptical; a preliminary 3D model of Leona was able to be constructived. Leona is approximately 80 by 55 kilometres, hence is projected to have a silhouette of roughly 46 by 41 milliarcseconds (mas). Betelgeuse has an apparent size in the sky of about 45 mas, but its diffuse atmosphere may make it appear 55 mas in size. A preliminary analysis of results showed only a slight dimming, consistent with a partial or annular eclipse.
