= List of geological features on 52246 Donaldjohanson =

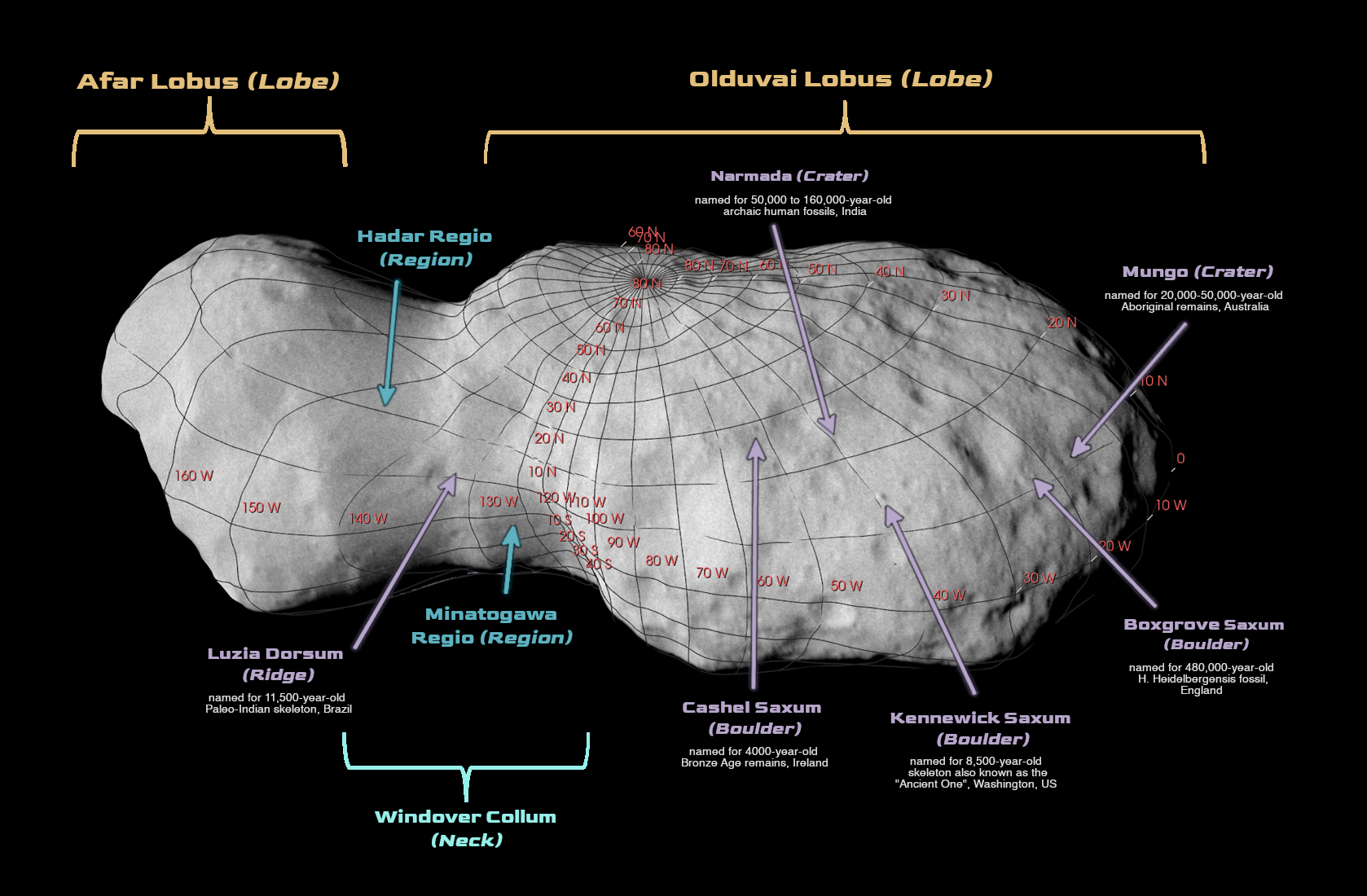
Photograph of Donaldjohanson with officially named geological features labeled

This is a list of geological features on the asteroid 52246 Donaldjohanson. The asteroid was visited on 20 April 2025 by NASA's Lucy mission en route to the Jupiter trojans. Its surface features are named after major paleoanthropological sites and discoveries, and names are adopted by the International Astronomical Union (IAU).

== Colli ==
Feature	Coordinates	Named After	Approval
Windover Collum	20°N 140°W	Windover Pond, archaeological site in Florida, United States	27 Aug 2025 · WGPSN

== Craters ==
Feature	Coordinates	Diameter (km)	Named After	Approval
Mungo	10.78°N 17.55°W	0.01	Lake Mungo, New South Wales, Australia, site of the Mungo Man and Mungo Woman	27 Aug 2025 · WGPSN
Narmada	22.52°N 39.35°W	0.01	Narmada River valley, India, site of the Narmada Human	27 Aug 2025 · WGPSN

== Dorsa ==
Feature	Coordinates	Length (km)	Named After	Approval
Luzia Dorsum	15°N 135°W	2	Luzia Woman, a 11,500 year old skeleton found in Lapa Vermelha, Brazil	27 Aug 2025 · WGPSN
Natunuku Dorsum	8.44°N 143.32°W	1.2	Natunuku, village and archaeological site in Fiji where the earliest skeleton of the Lapita culture was found	8 Oct 2026 · WGPSN

== Lobi ==
Feature	Diameter (km)	Named After	Approval
Afar Lobus	3.4	Afar Triangle, region that hosts many archaeological sites	27 Aug 2025 · WGPSN
Olduvai Lobus	5.4	Olduvai Gorge, major archaeological site in Tanzania	27 Aug 2025 · WGPSN

== Regiones ==
Feature	Coordinates	Diameter (km)	Named After	Approval
Hadar Regio	18°N 142°W	2.3	Hadar Formation, Ethiopia, site of the Lucy fossil	27 Aug 2025 · WGPSN
Minatogawa Regio	15°N 125°W	1.5	Minatogawa quarry, Okinawa, Japan, site of several early Homo sapiens skeletons known as the Minatogawa specimens	27 Aug 2025 · WGPSN

== Saxa ==
Feature	Coordinates	Named After	Approval
Boxgrove Saxum	11.22°N 22.03°W	Boxgrove, England, village that is host to the Boxgrove Paleolithic site	27 Aug 2025 · WGPSN
Cashel Saxum	28.4°N 51.8°W	Cashel, County Laois, Ireland, site of the Cashel Man	27 Aug 2025 · WGPSN
Kennewick Saxum	14.2°N 39.4°W	Kennewick, Washington, United States, site of the Kennewick Man	27 Aug 2025 · WGPSN
