= 1567 Alikoski =

Main-belt asteroid

Discovery
- Discovered by: Y. Väisälä
- Discovery site: Turku Obs.
- Discovery date: 22 April 1941

Designations
- Named after: Heikki Alikoski (astronomer)
- Alternative designations: 1941 HN · 1947 HE; 1947 HG · 1948 OC
- Minor planet category: main-belt · (outer)

Orbital characteristics
- Epoch 4 September 2017 (JD 2458000.5)
- Uncertainty parameter 0
- Observation arc: 78.55 yr (28,691 days)
- Aphelion: 3.4785 AU
- Perihelion: 2.9417 AU
- Semi-major axis: 3.2101 AU
- Eccentricity: 0.0836
- Orbital period (sidereal): 5.75 yr (2,101 days)
- Mean anomaly: 135.05°
- Mean motion: 0° 10^{m} 17.04^{s} / day
- Inclination: 17.279°
- Longitude of ascending node: 51.454°
- Argument of perihelion: 110.87°

Physical characteristics
- Dimensions: 62.36±17.29 km 67.83±2.1 km (IRAS:12); 67.933±0.584 km 69.242±0.432 km 70.06±0.80 km 77.10±19.58 km
- Synodic rotation period: 16.405±0.01 h
- Geometric albedo: 0.04±0.03; 0.05±0.04; 0.059±0.002; 0.0624±0.0160; 0.0626±0.004 (IRAS:12)
- Spectral type: PU (Tholen); C (SMASS) · C B–V = 0.720
- Absolute magnitude (H): 9.47

1567 Alikoski (provisional designation 1941 HN) is a rare-type carbonaceous asteroid from the outer region of the asteroid belt, approximately 67 kilometers in diameter. It was discovered on 22 April 1941, by Finnish astronomer Yrjö Väisälä at Turku Observatory in Southwest Finland. It was later named after Finnish astronomer Heikki Alikoski.

== Classification and orbit ==
This asteroid orbits the Sun in the outer main-belt at a distance of 2.9–3.5 AU once every 5 years and 9 months (2,101 days). Its orbit has an eccentricity of 0.08 and an inclination of 17° with respect to the ecliptic. Alikoski's observation arc begins with a precovery taken at Turku in 1938, extending it by 3 years prior to the asteroid's official discovery observation.

== Physical characteristics ==
=== Spectral type ===
Alikoski is characterized as both a carbonaceous C-type asteroid and as a rare PU-type in the SMASS and Tholen taxonomic scheme, respectively.

=== Rotation period ===
In March 2004, a rotational lightcurve of Alikoski was obtained by American amateur astronomer Robert Stephens at Santana Observatory in California. Lightcurve analysis gave a well-defined rotation period of 16.405 hours with a brightness variation of 0.16 magnitude (U=3).

=== Diameter and albedo ===
According to the space-based surveys carried out by the Infrared Astronomical Satellite IRAS, the Japanese Akari satellite, and NASA's Wide-field Infrared Survey Explorer with its subsequent NEOWISE mission, Alikoski measures between 62.36 and 77.10 kilometers in diameter, and its surface has a low albedo between 0.04 and 0.062. The Collaborative Asteroid Lightcurve Link adopts the results obtained by IRAS, that is, an albedo of 0.0626 and a diameter of 67.83 kilometers based on an absolute magnitude of 9.47.

== Naming ==
This minor planet was named in honor of Finnish astronomer Heikki Alikoski (1912–1997), assistant to the discoverer from 1937 to 1956, and an observer and discoverer of minor planets himself. He also helped greatly in establishing the Turku Astronomical-Optical Institute. The official naming citation was published by the Minor Planet Center on 20 February 1976 (M.P.C. 3930).
