= List of tumblers (small Solar System bodies) =

This is a list of tumblers, that is, small Solar System bodies or moons that do not rotate in a fairly constant manner with a constant period. Instead of rotating around a constant axis or around an axis that itself moves evenly, they appear to tumble (see Poinsot's ellipsoid for an explanation). For true tumbling, the three moments of inertia must be different. If two are equal, then the axis of rotation will simply precess in a circle. As of 2018, there are 3 natural satellites and 198 confirmed or likely tumblers out of a total of nearly 800,000 discovered small Solar System bodies. The data is sourced from the "Lightcurve Data Base" (LCDB). (Note: Data source, reference: Warner, B.D., Harris, A.W., Pravec, P. (2009). Icarus 202, 134-146. Updated November 2017. See: www.MinorPlanet.info) The tumbling of a body can be caused by the torque from asymmetrically emitted radiation known as the YORP effect.

Note that the rotation periods given below are apparent periods and are not constant for a tumbler. There is another definition of rotation, sometimes called intrinsic rotation, that relates to how the point on the object which is oriented along the axis of angular momentum moves around a principal axis on the object. The period for this rotation is constant, but may be quite different from the apparent rotation period. For example, for 99942 Apophis it is around 263 hours, whereas the apparent period is only around 31 hours.

== Natural satellites (moons) ==
This is a list of tumbling natural satellites (moons) that orbit planets and dwarf planets in the Solar System.

Moon	Satellite of	Rotation period (days)	Δmag	Diameter (km)	Abs. mag (H)	Refs
Hyperion	Saturn	~13		360.2 × 266 × 205.4		
Nix	Pluto	1.829		49.8 × 33.2 × 31.1		
Hydra	Pluto	0.4295		50.9 × 36.1 × 30.9		

== Small Solar System bodies ==
#	Small Solar System bodies (linked to articles only)	Tumbler		Rotation period (hours)	Δmag	Quality (U)	Class	Tax.	Diameter (km)	Abs. mag (H)	Refs
#	Small Solar System bodies (linked to articles only)	(status)	(flag)	Rotation period (hours)	Δmag	Quality (U)	Class	Tax.	Diameter (km)	Abs. mag (H)	Refs
1.	103P/Hartley	suspected	(T?RA)	18.1	–	2	comet	C	2.20	17.02	MPC
2.	1I/'Oumuamua	secure	(T)	7.9	2.50	2	rogue comet	D?	0.23 × 0.035 × 0.035	22.08	MPC
3.	2000 WL_{107}	secure	(T+)	0.2	1.10	3	NEO	S	0.04	24.44	MPC
4.	2002 CX_{58}	suspected	(T?)	51.7	1.12	2	NEO	S	0.10	22.30	MPC
5.	2002 NY_{40}	secure	(T)	20	1.30	3	NEO	S	0.36	19.23	MPC
6.	2004 FH	secure	(T)	0.1	1.16	3	NEO	S	0.02	25.70	MPC
7.	2006 CT	suspected	(T?)	16.7	0.80	2+	NEO	S	0.11	22.20	MPC
8.	2006 MV_{1}	suspected	(T?)	0.1	1.14	2	NEO	S	0.01	26.80	MPC
9.	2007 RQ_{12}	suspected	(T?)	0.2	1.90	1	NEO	S	0.06	23.60	MPC
10.	2007 TU24	secure	(T)	26	1.00	2	NEO	S	0.26	20.30	MPC
11.	2007 VM_{184}	suspected	(T?)	42	0.36	2	NEO	S	0.19	21.00	MPC
12.	2008 TC3	secure	(T)	0	1.02	3	NEO	F	0.00	30.90	MPC
13.	2009 DL_{46}	suspected	(T?)	42.3	1.08	2	NEO	S	0.12	22.00	MPC
14.	2009 WV_{25}	suspected	(T?)	5	1.24	2	NEO	S	0.05	24.00	MPC
15.	2009 XO_{2}	suspected	(T?N)	1.8	–	n.a.	NEO	S	0.06	23.50	MPC
16.	2010 RC_{130}	secure	(T+)	2.9	0.85	3	NEO	S	0.11	22.20	MPC
17.	2010 WC9	secure	(T)	0.2	0.95	3-	NEO	S	0.06	23.60	MPC
18.	2011 GP_{59}	secure	(T+)	0.1	2.00	3-	NEO	S	0.04	24.30	MPC
19.	2011 HS	suspected	(DT?)	6	1.80	2	NEO	S	0.18	21.10	MPC
20.	2011 YH_{40}	suspected	(T?)	2.3	1.02	2	NEO	S	0.08	22.90	MPC
21.	2012 FP_{52}	suspected	(NT?)	0	–	n.a.	NEO	S	0.04	24.60	MPC
22.	2012 QG_{42}	suspected	(T?)	24.2	1.18	3-	NEO	S	0.20	20.90	MPC
23.	2012 TC4	secure	(T)	0.2	0.93	3	NEO	S	0.01	26.70	MPC
24.	2013 ET	secure	(T+)	1.9	1.06	3-	NEO	S	0.07	23.10	MPC
25.	2013 GL_{8}	suspected	(T?)	64.6	0.68	2	NEO	S	0.52	18.80	MPC
26.	2013 RM_{43}	secure	(T)	32.6	0.75	3-	NEO	S	0.30	20.00	MPC
27.	2013 SU_{24}	secure	(T)	0.2	1.60	3	NEO	S	0.04	24.50	MPC
28.	2013 YL_{2}	secure	(T)	3	0.96	3	NEO	S	0.07	23.10	MPC
29.	2014 CU_{13}	suspected	(T?A)	14.4	0.45	2	NEO	S	0.12	21.90	MPC
30.	2014 HS_{184}	suspected	(T?)	2	0.89	2	NEO	S	0.07	23.30	MPC
31.	2014 SC324	secure	(T)	0.4	0.69	3	NEO	S	0.04	24.30	MPC
32.	2015 JY_{1}	secure	(T)	6.4	1.16	3-	NEO	S	0.21	20.80	MPC
33.	2015 KN_{120}	suspected	(T?)	46.3	0.59	2	NEO	S	0.25	20.40	MPC
34.	2015 VY_{105}	secure	(T)	0	0.96	3	NEO	S	0.01	29.00	MPC
35.	2015 XC	secure	(T)	0.2	0.55	3-	NEO	S	0.03	25.20	MPC
36.	2016 BC_{14}	suspected	(T?)	28.5	1.08	2	NEO	S	0.20	20.90	MPC
37.	2016 QS_{11}	secure	(T)	0.4	1.00	3	NEO	S	0.02	25.80	MPC
38.	2016 UE	secure	(TN)	1.8	1.25	3	NEO	S	0.03	25.10	MPC
39.	2017 BW	secure	(T)	14.5	0.53	2+	NEO	S	0.06	23.50	MPC
40.	2017 BY_{93}	suspected	(T?A)	1.8	0.14	1	NEO	S	0.07	23.10	MPC
41.	2017 CF_{32}	secure	(TN)	3.6	1.30	3	NEO	S	0.02	26.10	MPC
42.	2017 NH	secure	(T)	2.5	1.10	2+	NEO	S	0.15	21.50	MPC
43.	2018 AJ	secure	(T)	0.7	1.09	3	NEO	S	0.04	24.50	MPC
44.	333P/LINEAR	suspected	(T?)	21	0.45	2	comet	C	–	–	MPC
45.	460P/PANSTARRS	secure	(T)	36.6	0.32	2	NEC	–	–	–	MPC
46.	253 Mathilde	secure	(T)	417.7	0.50	3	MBA (middle)	C	58.01	10.30	List
47.	288 Glauke	secure	(T)	1170	0.90	3	MBA (outer)	S	32.24	10.00	List
48.	319 Leona	secure	(T)	430	0.50	3	MBA (outer)	C	68.01	10.10	List
49.	341 California	secure	(T)	318	0.92	3	Flora	S	14.67	10.55	List
50.	437 Rhodia	secure	(T)	433.2	0.35	3-	MBA (inner)	S	14.46	10.71	List
51.	496 Gryphia	secure	(T)	1072	1.25	3	Flora	S	15.47	11.61	List
52.	571 Dulcinea	secure	(T)	126.3	0.50	3	MBA (inner)	S	14.29	11.59	List
53.	703 Noëmi	suspected	(T?)	200	0.78	2	Flora	S	8.58	12.50	List
54.	763 Cupido	secure	(T)	151.5	0.45	3-	Flora	S	8.97	12.60	List
55.	1264 Letaba	suspected	(T?)	32.7	0.28	3	MBA (outer)	C	74.29	9.70	List
56.	1278 Kenya	secure	(T)	188	0.75	3	MBA (inner)	S	20.56	10.80	List
57.	1451 Granö	secure	(T)	138	0.65	2+	Flora	S	7.13	13.10	List
58.	1455 Mitchella	suspected	(T?)	118.7	0.60	2+	Flora	S	7.47	12.80	List
59.	1473 Ounas	secure	(T+)	139.1	0.60	3	MBA (inner)	S	17.62	11.70	List
60.	1479 Inkeri	secure	(T)	660	1.30	2+	MBA (middle)	XFU	17.52	11.90	List
61.	1512 Oulu	suspected	(T?)	132.3	0.33	2+	Hilda	P	82.72	9.62	List
62.	1536 Pielinen	secure	(T+)	66.2	0.85	3	Flora	S	7.82	12.70	List
63.	1573 Väisälä	suspected	(T?)	252	0.76	2	Phocaea	S	9.81	12.20	List
64.	1689 Floris-Jan	suspected	(T?)	145	0.40	3	MBA (inner)	S	16.21	11.74	List
65.	1703 Barry	suspected	(T?)	107.1	0.50	3	Flora	S	9.54	12.10	List
66.	1750 Eckert	secure	(T)	375	0.87	3-	Hungaria	S	6.97	13.15	List
67.	1775 Zimmerwald	secure	(T)	122	0.60	2+	Eunomia	S	11.55	12.00	List
68.	1989 Tatry	suspected	(T?)	131.3	0.50	2	Vestian	C	17.60	12.50	List
69.	2000 Herschel	secure	(T+)	130	1.16	2	MBA (inner)	S	16.71	11.25	List
70.	2035 Stearns	secure	(T)	93	0.70	2+	Hungaria	Xe	5.28	13.00	List
71.	2045 Peking	secure	(T)	82.4	0.80	2	Vestian	S	11.83	12.00	List
72.	2554 Skiff	suspected	(T?)	273	0.90	2	Flora	S	7.82	12.70	List
73.	2672 Pisek	suspected	(T?)	831	0.90	2+	Eunomia	S	9.60	12.40	List
74.	2675 Tolkien	suspected	(T?)	1060	0.75	2+	Flora	S	9.85	12.20	List
75.	2705 Wu	secure	(T)	150.5	1.20	3-	Flora	S	6.21	13.20	List
76.	2731 Cucula	suspected	(T?)	61.6	0.40	2+	MBA (outer)	C	50.85	10.80	List
77.	2733 Hamina	suspected	(T?)	93.2	0.48	2	MBA (inner)	S	8.18	12.80	List
78.	2942 Cordie	secure	(T)	80	1.10	2	Flora	S	6.81	13.00	List
79.	3160 Angerhofer	suspected	(T?)	44.7	0.32	2	Erigone	C	11.11	13.50	List
80.	3288 Seleucus	secure	(T)	75	1.00	3	NEO	S	2.20	15.50	List
81.	3447 Burckhalter	secure	(T+)	59.8	0.39	3	Hungaria	E	7.63	12.20	List
82.	3691 Bede	secure	(T)	226.8	0.50	2	NEO	X	1.83	15.22	List
83.	3833 Calingasta	secure	(T)	199	1.20	3	Mars crosser	C	2.59	15.30	List
84.	4142 Dersu-Uzala	suspected	(T?)	140	0.60	2	Hungaria	S	7.13	13.10	List
85.	4179 Toutatis	secure	(T)	176	1.46	3	NEO	S	2.45	15.30	List
86.	4450 Pan	secure	(T)	56.5	0.64	3	NEO	S	1.13	17.10	List
87.	4678 Ninian	suspected	(T?)	56.7	1.04	3-	Flora	S	5.17	13.60	List
88.	4690 Strasbourg	secure	(T)	69.2	0.80	2	Hungaria	E	4.62	13.60	List
89.	4718 Araki	suspected	(T?)	46.4	0.16	2	Vestian	S	7.13	13.10	List
90.	4750 Mukai	suspected	(T?)	38.3	0.40	2	Flora	S	4.50	13.90	List
91.	4902 Thessandrus	secure	(T)	738	0.60	2	Jupiter trojan	C	61.04	9.80	List
92.	5171 Augustesen	suspected	(T?)	480	0.80	3	Vestian	S	6.50	13.30	List
93.	5202 Charleseliot	suspected	(T?)	183	0.58	2	MBA (inner)	S	9.53	13.37	List
94.	5247 Krylov	secure	(T+)	81.5	1.50	2	Phocaea	S	10.06	12.20	List
95.	5378 Ellyett	secure	(T+)	47.3	0.48	2	Hungaria	C	4.22	13.80	List
96.	5577 Priestley	secure	(T)	160	0.85	3-	Hungaria	S	4.30	14.20	List
97.	(5645) 1990 SP	secure	(T)	30.4	0.70	2	NEO	S	1.65	17.24	List
98.	5851 Inagawa	suspected	(T?)	367.5	0.90	3	Eunomia	S	9.60	12.40	List
99.	5887 Yauza	suspected	(T?)	54.8	0.30	2	Flora	S	5.93	13.30	List
100.	5967 Edithlevy	secure	(T)	66	0.70	3-	Hungaria	E	4.22	13.80	List
101.	6063 Jason	secure	(T)	48.6	0.12	2	NEO	S	1.96	15.90	List
102.	6183 Viscome	suspected	(T?)	453	0.90	3-	Mars crosser	S	5.41	13.70	List
103.	6192 Javiergorosabel	secure	(T+)	78.9	0.95	3	MBA (inner)	S	7.39	12.80	List
104.	6271 Farmer	suspected	(T?)	250	0.22	2	Hungaria	E	4.62	13.60	List
105.	6461 Adam	secure	(T)	74	0.76	2	Hungaria	E	3.35	14.30	List
106.	6779 Perrine	suspected	(T?)	72.3	1.16	2	Flora	S	4.30	14.00	List
107.	7352 Hypsenor	secure	(T)	648	0.30	3-	Jupiter trojan	C	58.29	9.90	List
108.	7421 Kusaka	secure	(T)	96.5	0.70	2	MBA (middle)	S	8.39	13.50	List
109.	7430 Kogure	secure	(T)	335.9	0.57	2	MBA (inner)	S	7.82	12.90	List
110.	(7743) 1986 JA	suspected	(T?)	146.8	0.93	3-	MBA (inner)	S	5.93	13.50	List
111.	8130 Seeberg	suspected	(T?)	38.1	0.42	3-	Hilda	C	24.30	11.80	List
112.	(9400) 1994 TW_{1}	suspected	(T?)	97.1	1.04	2	NEO	S	3.11	14.90	List
113.	9739 Powell	suspected	(T?)	109	0.40	2	Hungaria	E	3.82	13.70	List
114.	(10772) 1990 YM	suspected	(T?)	69	1.30	3-	Phocaea	S	6.96	13.00	List
115.	11579 Tsujitsuka	suspected	(T?)	56.6	1.19	2	Eunomia	S	5.28	13.70	List
116.	(13331) 1998 SU_{52}	suspected	(T?)	375	0.80	3-	Jupiter trojan	C	29.21	11.40	List
117.	13553 Masaakikoyama	secure	(NT)	38	1.10	2	NEO	S	1.38	16.71	List
118.	13651 Wugang	secure	(T)	33.6	1.20	3	NEO	S	0.73	18.05	List
119.	14395 Tommorgan	secure	(T)	35.5	0.61	2+	Hungaria	E	2.11	15.30	List
120.	14764 Kilauea	secure	(T+)	19.8	1.20	2	Hungaria	E	2.79	14.70	List
121.	15977 Pyraechmes	suspected	(T?)	250	0.30	2-	Jupiter trojan	C	46.30	10.40	List
122.	16064 Davidharvey	secure	(T)	178.5	0.70	2	NEO	C	4.10	16.56	List
123.	16589 Hastrup	secure	(T)	128	0.62	2	Hungaria	E	2.19	14.96	List
124.	(16843) 1997 XX_{3}	suspected	(T?)	275	0.41	2	Hilda	C	21.16	12.10	List
125.	(16896) 1998 DS_{9}	suspected	(T?)	708	0.43	3-	Phocaea	S	6.06	13.30	List
126.	(17584) 1994 XF_{1}	secure	(T)	4.6	0.56	3-	MBA (inner)	S	5.16	13.80	List
127.	19763 Klimesh	suspected	(T?)	101	0.67	2	Phocaea	S	7.29	13.27	List
128.	(20231) 1997 YK	suspected	(T?)	178	0.70	2	Hungaria	E	3.85	14.00	List
129.	(20628) 1999 TS_{40}	suspected	(T?)	68.1	1.04	2	Hilda	C	16.81	12.60	List
130.	(24077) 1999 TD_{233}	secure	(T)	30.9	1.61	2	Hungaria	E	2.66	14.80	List
131.	(24242) 1999 XY_{100}	secure	(T+)	49.9	0.60	2	Mars crosser	S	3.74	14.50	List
132.	(25076) 1998 QM_{98}	secure	(T)	58.3	0.35	2	Hungaria	E	2.02	15.40	List
133.	(28017) 1997 YV_{13}	suspected	(T?)	47	0.15	2	MBA (inner)	S	5.00	13.91	List
134.	(29147) 1988 GG	secure	(T)	99	0.80	2+	Phocaea	S	4.60	13.90	List
135.	29292 Conniewalker	secure	(T+)	30.6	0.63	3-	Phocaea	S	4.57	13.59	List
136.	(31832) 2000 AP_{59}	secure	(T)	64	0.80	2	Mars crosser	S	3.41	14.70	List
137.	33319 Kunqu	suspected	(T?)	105	0.90	2+	Hungaria	E	2.43	15.00	List
138.	(33736) 1999 NY_{36}	suspected	(T?)	211	0.40	2	MBA (outer)	C	10.61	13.60	List
139.	(36298) 2000 JF_{10}	suspected	(T?)	82	0.75	2-	Hungaria	E	2.79	14.70	List
140.	(36316) 2000 LC_{12}	secure	(T)	56.5	1.22	2	Hungaria	E	2.92	14.60	List
141.	(38063) 1999 FH	suspected	(T?)	990	0.55	2	Mars crosser	S	3.92	14.40	List
142.	(38071) 1999 GU_{3}	suspected	(T?)	216	1.50	3	NEO	S	0.36	19.60	List
143.	(39618) 1994 LT	secure	(T)	140	0.85	2	Hungaria	E	2.02	15.40	List
144.	(39796) 1997 TD	suspected	(T?)	223.5	0.92	2	NEO	S	2.15	15.70	List
145.	(42843) 1999 RV_{11}	secure	(T)	894	1.32	2	Phocaea	S	3.49	14.50	List
146.	(43606) 2001 XQ_{2}	suspected	(T?)	87	1.30	2-	Hungaria	E	1.40	16.20	List
147.	(53319) 1999 JM8	secure	(T)	136	0.70	2	NEO	X	7.00	15.20	List
148.	(54789) 2001 MZ_{7}	secure	(T+)	37.6	1.40	3	NEO	S	2.97	15.00	List
149.	(55532) 2001 WG_{2}	secure	(T)	46.1	0.55	2	NEO	S	1.88	16.00	List
150.	(58155) 1988 VD	suspected	(T?)	7.1	0.36	2+	Hungaria	E	2.11	15.30	List
151.	(64107) 2001 TK_{8}	suspected	(T?)	68.5	1.31	2	Hungaria	E	2.54	14.90	List
152.	65637 Tsniimash	secure	(T)	220	0.90	3	Hungaria	E	3.35	14.30	List
153.	(68547) 2001 XW_{29}	secure	(T+)	36.7	0.60	3-	Hungaria	E	2.32	15.10	List
154.	(69350) 1993 YP	suspected	(AT?)	31.8	0.95	2	Hungaria	E	2.11	15.30	List
155.	79316 Huangshan	suspected	(T?)	493	0.62	2+	Hungaria	E	2.66	14.80	List
156.	(85867) 1999 BY_{9}	suspected	(T?)	25	0.90	1+	NEO	S	0.75	18.00	List
157.	(85953) 1999 FK_{21}	suspected	(T?)	68.4	0.87	2+	NEO	S	0.71	18.10	List
158.	(86039) 1999 NC43	suspected	(T?A)	34.5	1.10	2-	NEO	Q	2.22	16.10	List
159.	(86666) 2000 FL_{10}	suspected	(T?)	206	0.85	2	NEO	S	1.24	16.90	List
160.	(89136) 2001 US_{16}	secure	(T)	14.4	0.90	2	NEO	S	0.26	20.29	List
161.	99942 Apophis	secure	(T)	30.6	1.14	3	NEO	Q	0.35	19.09	List
162.	(120578) 1995 QV_{12}	suspected	(T?)	72.4	0.51	2	MBA (outer)	C	3.35	16.10	List
163.	(125742) 2001 XT_{117}	suspected	(T?)	60.8	1.40	3	Phocaea	C	2.65	15.10	List
164.	(134422) 1998 QM_{3}	secure	(T)	25.4	0.65	2+	Hungaria	E	1.60	15.90	List
165.	(134549) 1999 RN_{154}	suspected	(T?)	124	0.55	2-	Flora	S	1.97	15.70	List
166.	(143404) 2003 BD_{44}	suspected	(T?)	78.6	1.05	2+	NEO	S	1.24	16.90	List
167.	(143651) 2003 QO104	suspected	(T?)	114.4	1.60	3	NEO	S	1.88	16.00	List
168.	(152679) 1998 KU_{2}	secure	(T)	125	1.35	2	NEO	S	1.42	16.60	List
169.	(154807) 2004 PP_{97}	suspected	(T?)	161	0.96	2	NEO	S	0.57	18.60	List
170.	(162004) 1991 VE	secure	(T+)	13.5	1.11	3	NEO	S	0.68	18.20	List
171.	(162900) 2001 HG_{31}	secure	(T)	60.6	0.56	3	NEO	S	2.06	15.80	List
172.	(163732) 2003 KP_{2}	suspected	(NT?)	151.1	1.70	3	NEO	S	2.47	15.40	List
173.	(163899) 2003 SD220	suspected	(T?)	285	2.20	2+	NEO	S	1.03	17.30	List
174.	(168381) 1997 LY_{4}	secure	(T)	46.1	1.00	3	Mars crosser	S	1.30	16.80	List
175.	(181882) 1999 RF_{14}	suspected	(T?)	2.5	0.20	1	Mars crosser	S	3.74	14.50	List
176.	(183581) 2003 SY_{84}	suspected	(T?)	260	0.87	2	Mars crosser	S	2.84	15.10	List
177.	(206378) 2003 RB	suspected	(T?)	37.5	0.43	2	NEO	S	0.54	18.70	List
178.	(214869) 2007 PA8	secure	(T)	102.2	0.58	3	NEO	S	1.38	16.67	List
179.	(217807) 2000 XK_{44}	secure	(T)	51.9	1.20	3	NEO	Q	0.71	18.10	List
180.	(232368) 2003 AZ_{2}	suspected	(T?)	31.1	0.96	2+	NEO	S	0.65	18.30	List
181.	(253106) 2002 UR_{3}	suspected	(T?)	180	0.36	2	NEO	S	1.42	16.60	List
182.	(267337) 2001 VK_{5}	suspected	(T?)	39.1	0.92	2	NEO	S	0.78	17.90	List
183.	(306790) 2001 KB_{1}	suspected	(T?)	71	0.85	2	Mars crosser	S	3.41	14.70	List
184.	(331471) 1984 QY_{1}	secure	(T)	45.5	0.65	2	NEO	S	2.25	15.60	List
185.	367943 Duende	secure	(T)	8.7	1.79	3	NEO	S	0.05	24.00	List
186.	(368664) 2005 JA_{22}	suspected	(T?)	31.7	0.92	2+	NEO	S	0.57	18.60	List
187.	(374158) 2004 UL	secure	(T)	38	1.20	2	NEO	S	0.52	18.80	List
188.	(380929) 2006 HU_{30}	suspected	(T?)	49	0.17	2	NEO	S	0.36	19.60	List
189.	(388945) 2008 TZ_{3}	suspected	(T?)	44.2	0.56	2	NEO	S	0.25	20.40	List
190.	398188 Agni	secure	(T)	22	1.12	2	NEO	S	0.37	19.50	List
191.	(416186) 2002 TD_{60}	secure	(T+)	2.9	2.00	3	NEO	S	0.40	19.90	List
192.	(443103) 2013 WT_{67}	suspected	(T?)	135	1.10	2	NEO	S	0.75	18.00	List
193.	(444193) 2005 SE_{71}	secure	(T)	66.8	0.80	2	NEO	S	0.71	18.10	List
194.	(464798) 2004 JX_{20}	secure	(T+)	36	0.38	2	NEO	S	0.39	19.40	List
195.	(467317) 2000 QW_{7}	suspected	(NT?)	71.3	1.00	2	NEO	S	0.33	19.80	List
196.	(467336) 2002 LT38	suspected	(T?)	21.8	1.16	2+	NEO	S	0.24	20.50	List
197.	(477762) 2010 XZ_{67}	suspected	(T?)	15	0.21	2-	NEO	S	0.34	19.70	List
198.	(511137) 2013 XM_{24}	secure	(T)	37.9	0.80	2	NEO	S	0.47	19.00	List

back to top

== See also ==
- List of slow rotators (minor planets)
- List of fast rotators (minor planets)
