= 1512 Oulu =

Hildian asteroid and slow rotator

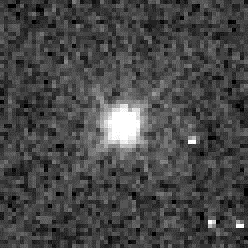
- Hubble Space Telescope image of Oulu taken in 2012

Discovery
- Discovered by: H. Alikoski
- Discovery site: Turku Obs.
- Discovery date: 18 March 1939

Designations
- Named after: Oulu (Finnish town)
- Alternative designations: 1939 FE · 1938 CU; 1957 TA · 1958 XS
- Minor planet category: main-belt · Hilda

Orbital characteristics
- Epoch 4 September 2017 (JD 2458000.5)
- Uncertainty parameter 0
- Observation arc: 78.06 yr (28,510 days)
- Aphelion: 4.5541 AU
- Perihelion: 3.3892 AU
- Semi-major axis: 3.9717 AU
- Eccentricity: 0.1466
- Orbital period (sidereal): 7.92 yr (2,891 days)
- Mean anomaly: 333.83°
- Mean motion: 0° 7^{m} 28.2^{s} / day
- Inclination: 6.4785°
- Longitude of ascending node: 10.168°
- Argument of perihelion: 238.20°
- Jupiter MOID: 0.6287 AU

Physical characteristics
- Dimensions: 65.0 km 65.000±4.137 km 79.222±0.241 km 82.72±2.5 km (IRAS:38); 91.05±2.20 km
- Synodic rotation period: 132.3±0.1 h
- Geometric albedo: 0.031±0.001; 0.0366±0.002 (IRAS:38); 0.038±0.005; 0.0536±0.0061; 0.0594; 0.06±0.03
- Spectral type: Tholen = P · X · P B–V = 0.715; U–B = 0.190
- Absolute magnitude (H): 9.62 · 9.92±0.40

1512 Oulu (provisional designation 1939 FE) is a dark Hildian asteroid, slow rotator and possibly the largest known tumbler orbiting in the outermost region of the asteroid belt. With a diameter of approximately 80 kilometers, it belongs to the fifty largest asteroids in the outer main-belt. The body was discovered on 18 March 1939, by Finnish astronomer Heikki Alikoski at Turku Observatory in Southwest Finland and named for the Finnish town Oulu.

== Orbit and classification ==
Located in the outermost part of the main-belt, Oulu is a member of the Hilda family, a large orbital group of asteroids that are thought to have originated from the Kuiper belt. They orbit in a 3:2 orbital resonance with the gas giant Jupiter, meaning that for every 2 orbits Jupiter completes around the Sun, a Hildian asteroid will complete 3 orbits. As it does not cross the path of any of the planets, it will not be pulled out of orbit by Jupiter's gravitational field, and will likely remain in a stable orbit for thousands of years.

Oulu orbits the Sun at a distance of 3.4–4.6 AU once every 7 years and 11 months (2,891 days). Its orbit has an eccentricity of 0.15 and an inclination of 6° concerning the ecliptic. In 1938, Oulu was first identified as 1938 CU at Bergedorf Observatory. Its observation arc, however, begins one month after its official discovery observation.

== Physical characteristics ==
Oulu is characterized as a dark and reddish P-type asteroid in the Tholen taxonomy, of which only a few dozen bodies are currently known.

=== Slow rotator and likely tumbler ===
In May 2009, a rotational light curve of Oulu was obtained from photometric observations by Slovak astronomer Adrián Galád at Modra Observatory. Lightcurve analysis gave a rotation period of 132.3 hours with a brightness variation of 0.33 in magnitude (U=2+). It is among the top few hundred slow rotators.

Oulu is likely in a state of non-principal axis rotation, which is commonly known as tumbling. It is the largest such object ever observed (also see List of tumblers).

=== Diameter and albedo ===
According to the surveys carried out by the Infrared Astronomical Satellite IRAS, the Japanese Akari satellite, and NASA's Wide-field Infrared Survey Explorer with its subsequent NEOWISE mission, Oulu measures between 65.00 and 91.05 kilometers in diameter, and its surface has an albedo between 0.031 and 0.06.

The Collaborative Asteroid Lightcurve Link agrees with IRAS, that is, an albedo of 0.0366 and a diameter of 82.72 kilometers using an absolute magnitude of 9.62. In May 2002, Vasilij Shevchenko and Edward Tedesco observed an occultation by Oulu, that gave a diameter of 65.0 kilometers with an occultation albedo of 0.0594.

== Naming ==
This minor planet was named for the northern Finnish town Oulu, the birthplace of the discoverer. The official naming citation was published by the Minor Planet Center on 30 January 1964 (M.P.C. 2278).
