= Heikki A. Alikoski =

Finnish astronomer (1912–1997)

Minor planets discovered: 13
see § List of discovered minor planets

Heikki A. Alikoski (1912, in Oulu – 28 December 1997, in Turku) was a Finnish astronomer and discoverer of minor planets.

From 1937 to 1956, he was an observatory assistant under Yrjö Väisälä at Turku Observatory, where he discovered 12 asteroids. Alikoski later helped establish the Turku Astronomical–Optical Institute.

The outer main-belt asteroid 1567 Alikoski, discovered by Yrjö Väisälä in 1941, was named in his honour.

== List of discovered minor planets ==
1508 Kemi	21 October 1938	list
1512 Oulu	18 March 1939	list
1697 Koskenniemi	8 September 1940	list
1715 Salli	9 April 1938	list
1786 Raahe	9 October 1948	list
2180 Marjaleena	8 September 1940	list
2257 Kaarina	18 August 1939	list

2487 Juhani	8 September 1940	list
2573 Hannu Olavi	10 March 1953	list
2714 Matti	5 April 1938	list
2911 Miahelena	8 April 1938	list
3776 Vartiovuori	5 April 1938	list
4066 Haapavesi	7 September 1940	list

== See also ==
- List of minor planet discoverers § H. Alikoski
